= Battle of Carnifex Ferry =

Battle of the American Civil War

Coordinates: 38°12′32″N 80°56′19″W

- Part of the American Civil War
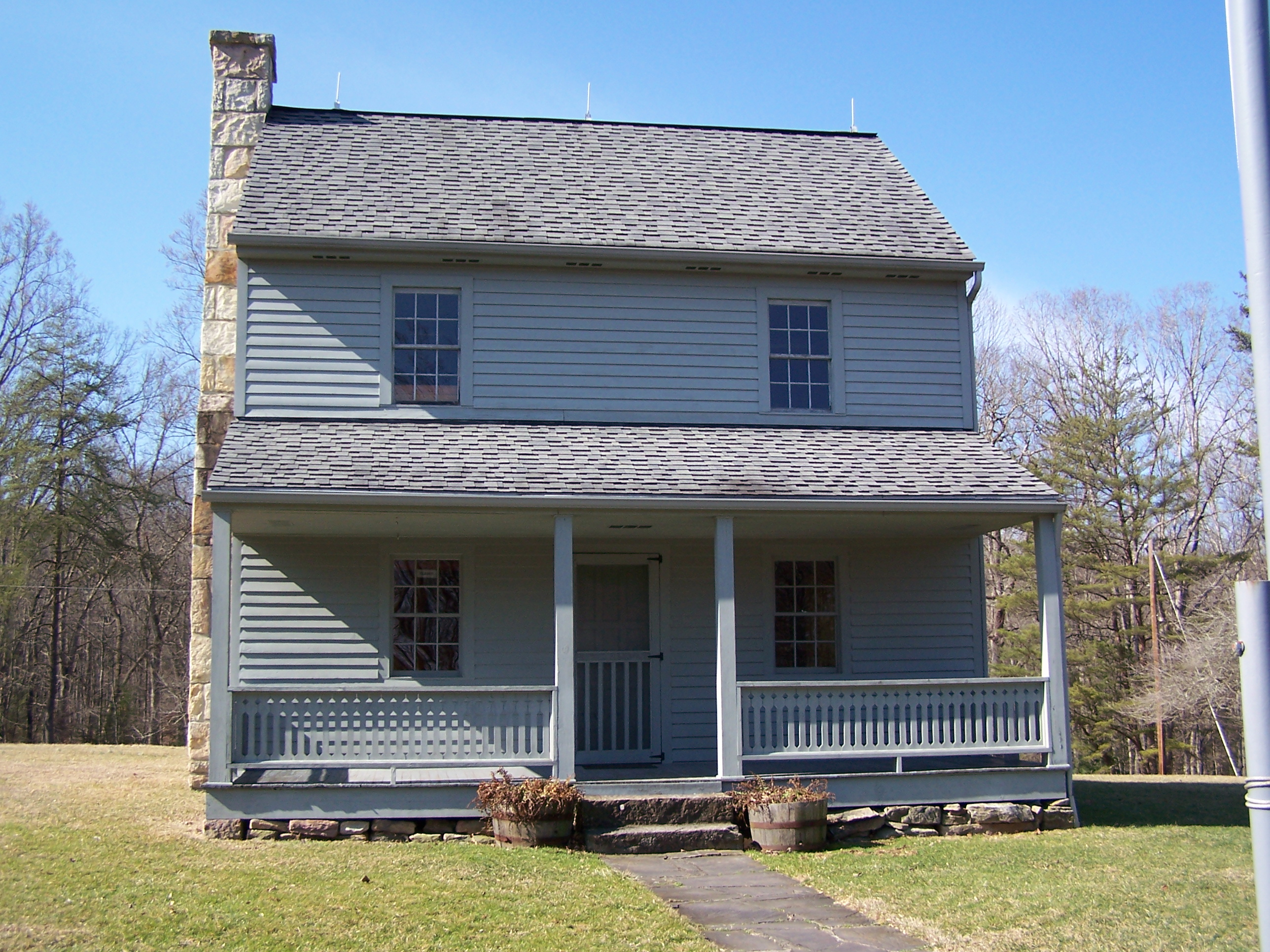
- Patterson House
Date	September 10, 1861
Location	Nicholas County, Virginia (now West Virginia)
Result	Union victory

Belligerents
United States of America (Union)	(Confederate States of America) CSA (Confederacy)

Commanders and leaders
William S. Rosecrans	John B. Floyd

Strength
~5,000	~2,000

Casualties and losses
17 killed 141 wounded	unknown killed 30 wounded

The Battle of Carnifex Ferry took place on September 10, 1861 in Nicholas County, Virginia (now West Virginia), as part of the Operations in Western Virginia Campaign during the American Civil War. The battle resulted in a Union strategic victory that contributed to the eventual Confederate withdrawal from western Virginia, which in turn led to the creation of the State of West Virginia two years later.

The battle took its name from a former settlement, which was named after the local Carnefix family.

== The battle ==
In late August 1861, Confederate forces under Brig. Gen. John B. Floyd crossed the Gauley River and surprised the 7th Ohio Infantry under Col. Erastus Tyler at Kessler's Cross Lanes. Outnumbered, Tyler's inexperienced men were routed, and Floyd camped near Carnifex Ferry. The Confederates began throwing up entrenchments on the Henry Patteson farm (located on the rim of the Gauley River Canyon near Summersville).

Concerned about Floyd's drive to reclaim the Kanawha Valley, Union Brigadier General William S. Rosecrans led three brigades of infantry southward from Clarksburg to support Tyler's regrouped regiment. Moving into position on the afternoon of September 10, Rosecrans advanced against Floyd's campsite and attacked. The Confederate lines repulsed the attacks and the Federal casualties were significantly higher than the defenders. The strength of Rosecrans's artillery proved to be problematic however, and Floyd decided to retreat that night across the ferry to the south side of the Gauley River. He subsequently moved eastward to Meadow Bluff near Lewisburg.

Floyd, seeking to deflect the blame, placed the responsibility for the defeat on his co-commander Brigadier General Henry A. Wise, furthering the dissension that marked the Confederate high command in western Virginia.

== Battlefield preservation ==
In October 1935, the battlefield was preserved as Carnifex Ferry Battlefield State Park.

== Gallery ==
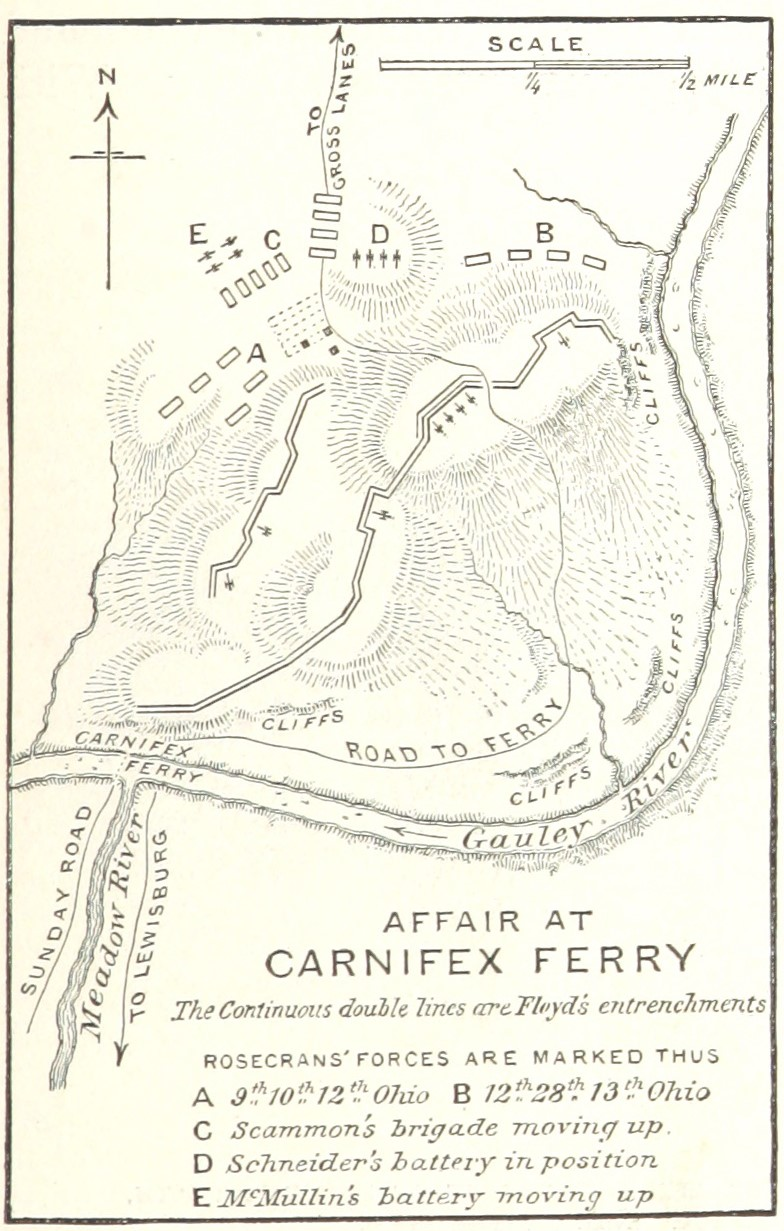
A map of the battle

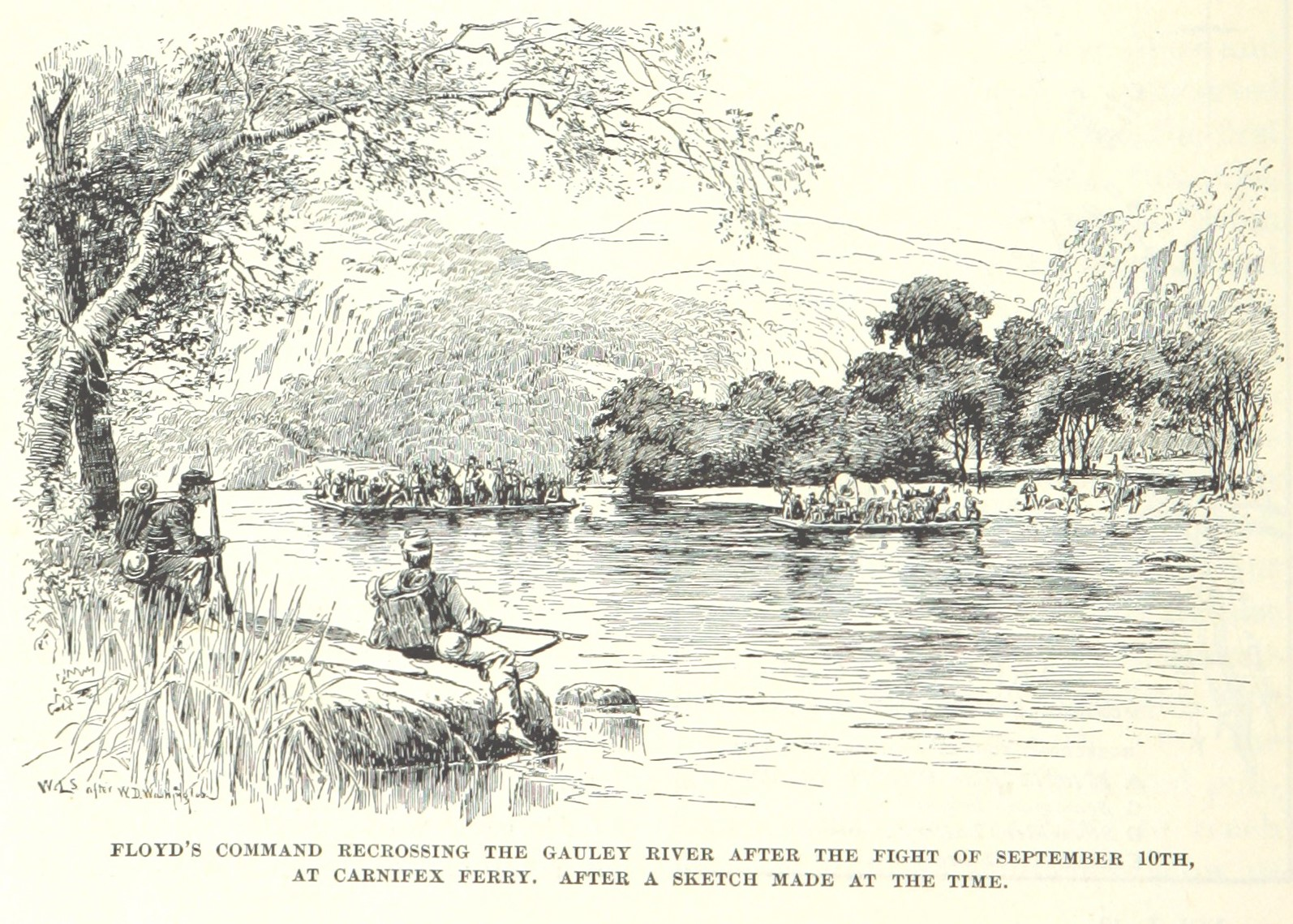
General Floyd's troops retreat across the river

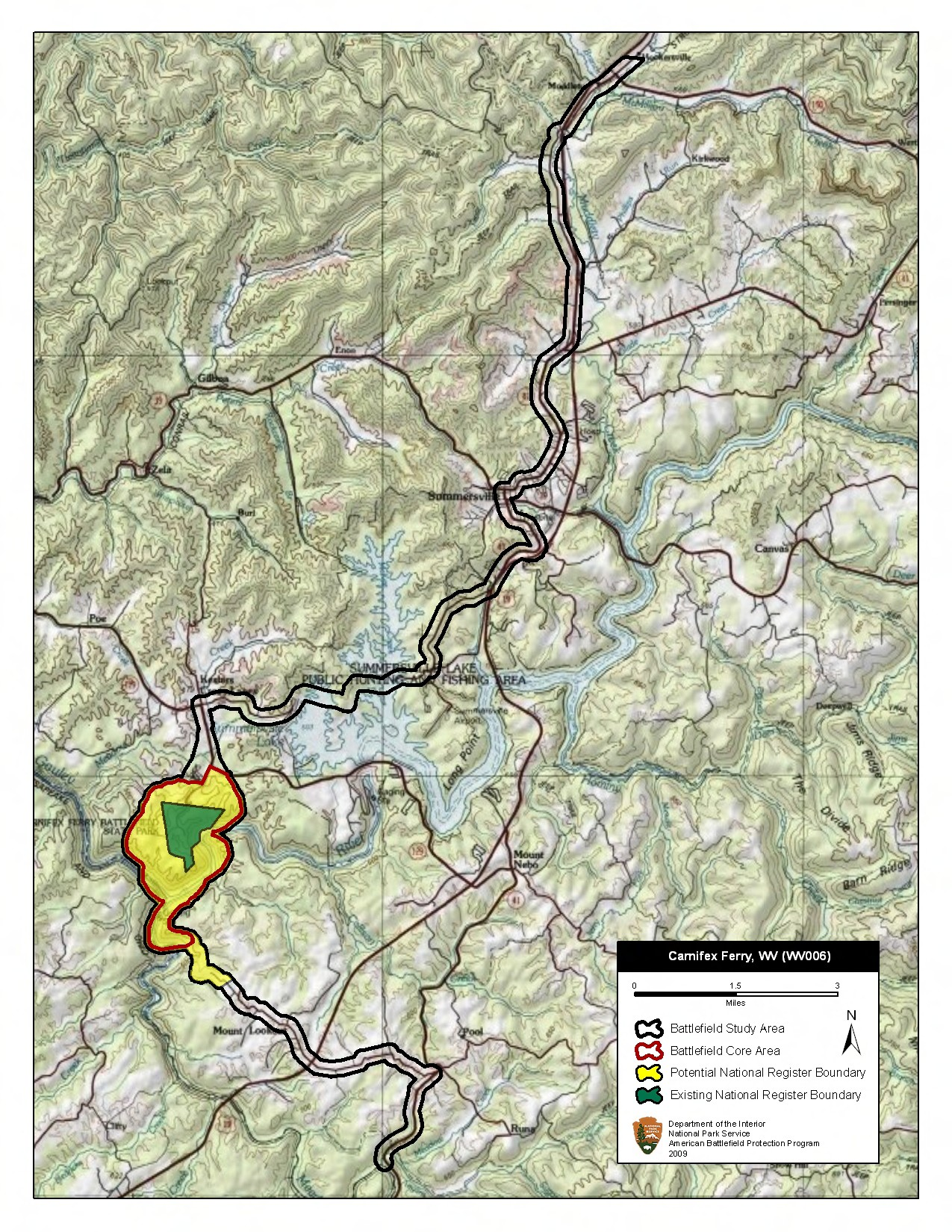
Map of Carnifex Ferry Battlefield core and study areas by the American Battlefield Protection Program

== See also ==
- Thomas J. Kelly (Irish nationalist)
