= 103rd Ohio Infantry Regiment =

- Active: 1862–1865
- Country: United States of America
- Allegiance: Union
- Branch: Volunteer Army
- Type: Infantry
- Size: ~1,078 soldiers at the outset of the war
- Engagements: Kentucky Campaign; Defense of Cincinnati; Atlanta campaign; Franklin-Nashville Campaign; Carolinas campaign

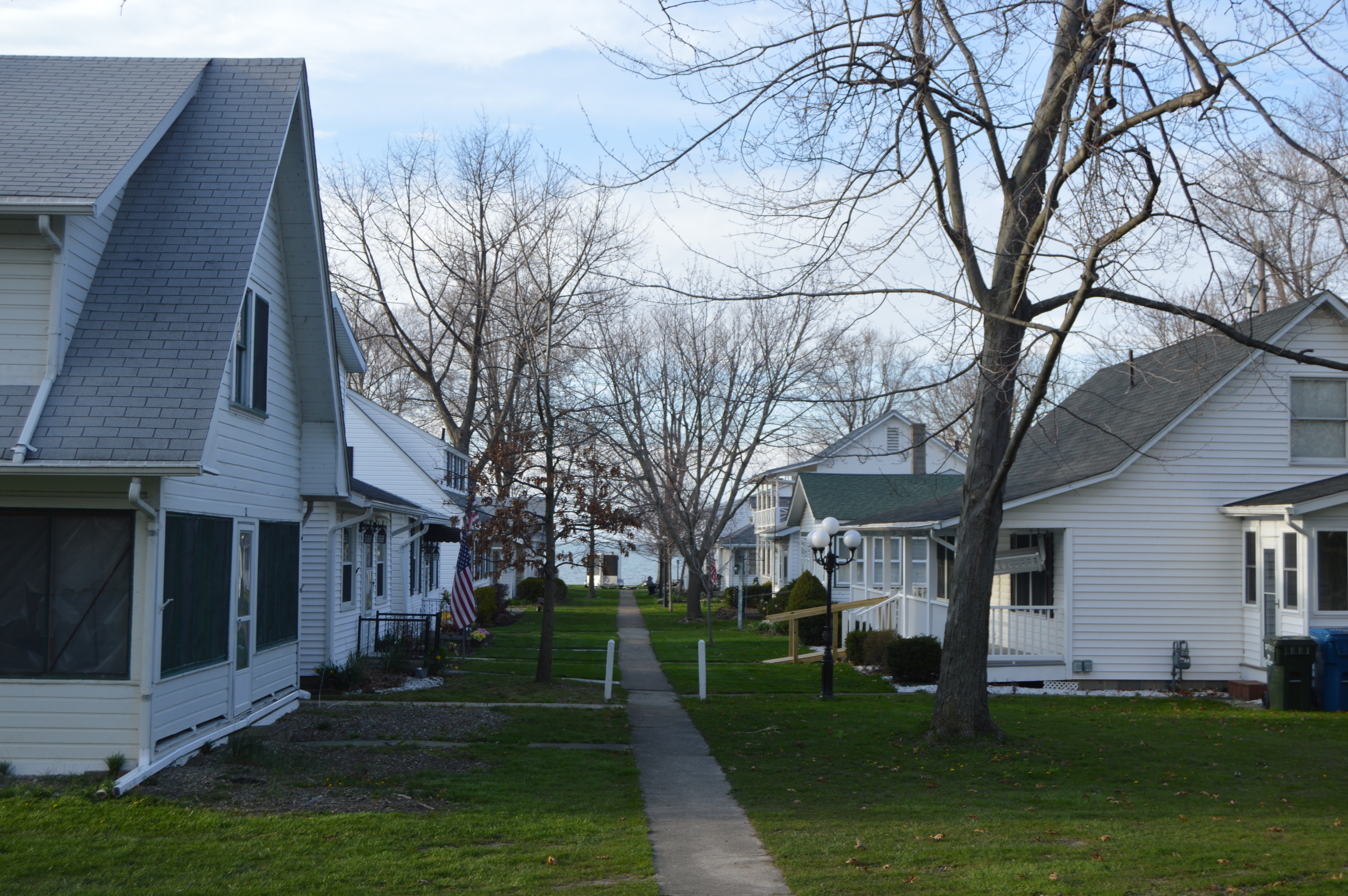
103rd OVI complex in Sheffield Lake

The 103rd Ohio Infantry Regiment, sometimes 103rd Regiment, Ohio Volunteer Infantry was a three-years' infantry regiment from northeastern Ohio that served in the Union Army during the American Civil War. It participated in many of the campaigns and battles of the Army of the Ohio in the Western Theater.

"this Regiment was organized in the State of Ohio at large, in August and September, 1862, to serve for three years. It was mustered out of service June 12, 1865, in accordance with orders from the War Department. The official list of battles in which this Regiment bore an honorable part is not yet published by the War Department, but the following list has been compiled after careful research during the preparation of this work"

Blue Spring Tennessee, October 5, 1863

Knoxville Tennessee,(Siege) November 17 to December 4, 1863

Dandridge Tennessee, January 16–18, 1864

Resaca Georgia, May 13–16, 1864

Atlanta Georgia,(Siege) July 28 – September 2, 1864

Spring Hill Tennessee, November 29, 1864

The battle and the enlistment records of every soldier from the 103rd Ohio Infantry is available online.

Needing additional soldiers, President Lincoln put out the call for volunteers to serve in the Union army. Several hundred men - mostly farmers - from the northern Ohio counties of Cuyahoga, Medina, and Lorain answered the call. This unit was organized in Cleveland in August 1862 and became known as the 103rd Regiment of the Ohio Volunteer Infantry"

On July 21, 1862, William B. Castle, as chairman of the District Military Committee in Cleveland, sent a letter to Governor David Tod, enclosing a copy of a resolution recommending that the appointment of company officers for the 103rd Regiment, Ohio Volunteer Infantry. The new regiment was to draw members from Cuyahoga County, Lorain County and Medina County.

The 103rd OVI was organized at Cleveland in August 1862 under command of Colonel John S. Casement. It was ordered to Kentucky on September 3, 1862, and attached to the 2nd Brigade, 1st Division, Army of Kentucky, Department of the Ohio. The regiment saw action in Kentucky, Georgia, Alabama and Tennessee. After mustering up near Cleveland Ohio, then travelling by train to Cincinnati, where the 103 OVI ferried across the Ohio River to Covington. September 10–11, 1862 members of the 103rd OVI skirmish with Henry Heth, before the rebels retreated to Lexington, Kentucky. From Fort Mitchell the 103rd OVI marched approximately ninety miles to Lexington, Kentucky, where the infantry men boarded a train to Frankfort, Kentucky, arriving around 1:00 pm on October 30, 1862

March 26, 1863, The 103 Ohio Volunteer Infantry Commanded by Colonel John S. Casement begins construction of Fort on a Hill in Frankfort Kentucky. Originally named Fort Crittenden by the 103 OVI in honour of Kentucky's famed United States Senator John J. Crittenden, who gave the 103rd OVI a rousing speech and warm welcome when they arrived. Sometime during the war this Frankfort post received the name Fort Boone, not to be confused with Fort Boone. Lyman Beecher Hannaford describes "We have now moved our encampment up on the hill in the rear of the fort", the planned Fort would overlook the city providing defense of the now Union controlled Kentucky Capital, the only Union capital to fall to the Rebels"

"Towards the city, there is first a stone wall and an embankment about 5 feet high and 8 feet thick. This is right on the brow of the hill. The embankment on the other side is about ten feet thick and eight feet high. On the inside is a platform or shelf about three or four feet wide for infantry to stand on to repel an attack. On the outside of the embankment there is a ditch 8 feet wide and five feet deep". 1–inside of fort 2–shelf for infantry 3–embankment of dirt 4–cedar brush 2 feet thick and projecting over the side of the ditch about 18 inches. The other end buried in the embankment, 5–ditch. I understand that it is going to be mounted with 12 guns. Six 32-pounders & six 64-pounders. "I shall now tell you how large the fort is. It is about ten rods [55 yards] wide at the widest place and thirty rods [165 yards] long."

May 7, 1865, " The 103rd will remain at Department Headquarters in Raleigh until they go home."

June 2 1865, the 103rd is expecting a October 1, 1865 muster out date, as they are in Raleigh North Carolina preparing to go back home to Ohio.

The 103rd mustered out on June 12, 1865. It lost during its term of service two officers and 137 enlisted men killed and mortally wounded, and three officers and 106 enlisted men by disease, a total 248 fatalities.

List of casualties: (under construction via 103 OVI Roster Index)

Field and Staff

Assistant Surgeon, Frank M. Andrews, Died October 8, 1864

Company A

Captain, Isaac C. Vail, died August 10, 1863, at Danville Kentucky

In 1866, veterans formed the 103rd O.V.I. Association. They and/or their descendants have held a reunion every year since, the only U.S. organization of its kind. The association operates the 103rd Ohio Volunteer Infantry Museum in Sheffield Lake, Ohio, that houses, preserves and displays historic Civil War relics which have been inherited, collected by or donated to the descendants of the members.

June 17, 1886, at a meeting of the Cuyahoga County Soldiers' and Sailors' Union, held at Bedford, it was determined that the time had arrived to commence the undertaking, which had for many years been contemplated by that body, of erecting the Memorial that had been authorized by Legislative enactment, accordingly a vote was taken as to the character and style of the structure. The names of members of the 103rd OVI can be found on this monument as well as an image depicting the Color Guard of the 103rd OVI "in vivid truthfulness" a gallant defense of the flag by the 103rd Ohio Infantry at the battle of Resaca Georgia, May 13–16, 1864. "The lion-hearted Sergeant Matin Striebler and eight Corporals stood before the enemys fire until they were wounded or killed (pg17).

March 9, 2014, Charles Levereth Bonney, 103rd OVI letter to Henry Sanford is transcribed. In the letter from Fort Mitchell, where the 103rd Ohio Infantry had been brought to bolster the Defense of Cincinnati from Confederate Brigadier General Henry Heth, Charles indicates in his letter that some of the men had gone out and skirmished. Reports from the Rebels indicate skirmishing near Fort Mitchell on September 10–11, 1862 before returning south to Lexington, Kentucky, on September 12, 1862.

September 2018, 83 letters written by Corporal Lyman Beecher Hannaford of the 103rd OVI during the American Civil War are transcribed with footnotes and images.

== See also ==
- Ohio in the American Civil War
- Cleveland Civil War Roundtable
- Cleveland in the Civil War
