= 5th Ohio Infantry Regiment =

- Active: 1861–1865
- Country: United States
- Allegiance: Union
- Branch: Volunteer Army
- Type: Infantry
- Size: 1,080 soldiers (July 1861)
- Engagements: First Kernstown; Port Republic; Cedar Mountain; Antietam; Dumfries; Chancellorsville; Gettysburg; Wauhatchie; Lookout Mountain; Missionary Ridge; Resaca; Dallas; Kennesaw Mountain; Peachtree Creek; Atlanta; Sherman's March to the Sea; Bentonville

Insignia
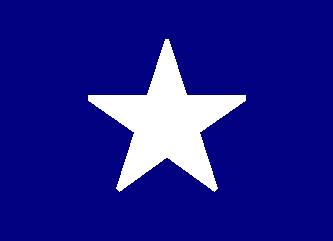
- 2nd Division, XX Corps, Army of the Cumberland

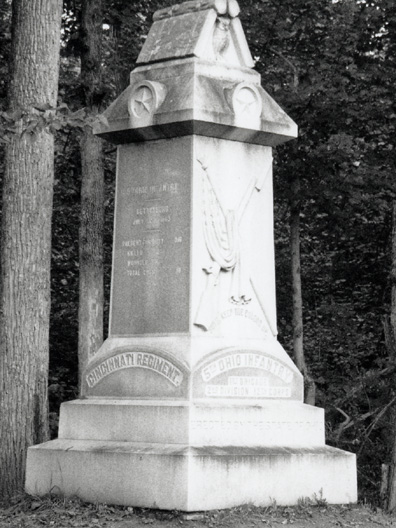
5th Ohio Infantry Monument, Gettysburg Battlefield.

The 5th Ohio Infantry Regiment was a three-month regiment and later a three-year infantry regiment from southwestern Ohio that served in the Union Army during the American Civil War, serving in both the Eastern and Western Theaters in a series of campaigns and battles. It was noted for its holding the high ground at the center of the line at Antietam as part of Tyndale's 1st Brigade, Greene's 2nd Division of Mansfield's XII Corps.

== Organization and service ==
The 5th Ohio Infantry Regiment was organized at Camp Harrison near Cincinnati on 20 April 1861, for three months service. The men were mustered into service on 8 May. The regiment moved to Camp Dennison on 23 May, and was on duty there until 20 June.

After its initial term of enlistment expired, the regiment was reorganized on 20 June 1861, for three years, under Colonel Samuel H. Dunning. The remaining three-months men who did not re-enlist in the new regiment were mustered out on 24 July.

The regiment served in western Virginia for most of the balance of the year. In 1862, the regiment was sent into Virginia's Shenandoah Valley, where it suffered significant casualties during First Battle of Kernstown in March. At the subsequent Battle of Port Republic on 9 June, the Buckeyes lost 244 killed, wounded and prisoners. Its ranks much depleted from the Valley Campaign, the regiment served in the defenses of Washington, D.C. under John Pope and participated in the Northern Virginia Campaign.

The 5th Ohio Infantry was heavily involved in the fighting at the Battle of Antietam on 17 September 1862. It was part of Major General Joseph Mansfield's XII Corps and Lt. Col. Hector Tyndale's Brigade, along with the 7th Ohio Infantry, 66th Ohio Infantry, and 28th Pennsylvania Infantry Regiments. Entering the battle in support of Joseph Hooker's I Corps, Tyndale's brigade inflicted heavy casualties on Alfred H. Colquitt's brigade and helped drive the Confederates out of the Cornfield. Pushing the Confederates south to the Dunker Church, Tyndale's men held the area until the afternoon when lack of support, heavy losses and low ammunition compelled them to retreat.

In 1863, the partially replenished 5th Ohio Infantry fought in the Army of the Potomac at Chancellorsville and then served in the Gettysburg campaign. Transferred later in the summer to the Western Theater (Note: The route began on the United States Military Railroad (USMRR) in Virginia before transitioning to the Baltimore & Ohio RR from Washington to Columbus, the Columbus, Piqua and Indiana Railroad (CP&I) and Indiana Central Railway to Indianapolis, the Louisville, New Albany and Chicago Railroad (LNA&C) to Louisville, the Louisville & Nashville Railroad (L&N) to Nashville, and finally using the Nashville & Chattanooga Railway (N&CR) to reach Bridgeport. Hooker's command traveled 1,200 miles from Virginia to Knoxville in eleven and a half days with two corps of 20,000 men arriving intact with all arms and supplies. In contrast, Longstreet's 12,000 troops arrived piecemeal after a twelve-day 800-mile journey with fifteen different railroads. The Rebels' original plan of four-days travel over five railroads and 540 miles had been scuttled by the Burnside's capture of Knoxville cutting the East Tennessee and Virginia Railroad.) and becoming part of the XX Corps under Joseph Hooker, the regiment participated in the Battle of Lookout Mountain near Chattanooga, Tennessee.

The following year, the regiment served in the forces under William T. Sherman in the Atlanta campaign and was part of Sherman's March to the Sea and the subsequent operations against Confederate-held Savannah, Georgia. In the spring of 1865, the regiment served in the Carolinas campaign.

During the Civil War, the 5th Ohio Infantry participated in 28 battles and sustained a loss of more than 500 men killed, wounded and prisoners.

== Affiliations, battle honors, detailed service, and casualties ==
=== Organizational affiliation ===
Attached to:

- Kelly's Command, West Virginia, to January 1862
- 2nd Brigade, Landers' Division, Army of the Potomac (AoP), to March, 1862.
- 2nd Brigade, Shields' 2nd Division, Banks' V Corps, Department of the Shenandoah, to May 1862.
- 2nd Brigade, Shields' Division, Department of the Rappahannock, to June, 1862
- 2nd Brigade, 1st Division, II Corps, Pope's Army of Virginia (AoV), to August, 1862
- 2nd Brigade, 1st Division, II Corps, AoV, to September, 1862
- 1st Brigade, 2nd Division, XII Corps, Army of the Potomac (AoP), to October, 1863
- 1st Brigade, 2nd Division, XII Corps, Army of the Cumberland (AoC), to April, 1864
- 1st Brigade, 2nd Division, XX Corps, AoC, to November, 1864
- Pardee's 1st Brigade, Geary's 2nd Division, Williams' XX Corps, Slocum's Army of Georgia, to July, 1865

=== List of battles ===
The official list of battles in which the regiment bore a part:

- First Battle of Kernstown
- Battle of Port Republic
- Battle of Cedar Mountain
- Battle of Antietam
- Battle of Dumfries
- Battle of Chancellorsville
- Battle of Gettysburg
- Battle of Wauhatchie
- Battle of Lookout Mountain
- Battle of Missionary Ridge
- Battle of Resaca
- Battle of Dallas
- Battle of Kennesaw Mountain
- Battle of Peachtree Creek
- Battle of Atlanta
- Sherman's March to the Sea
- Battle of Bentonville

=== Detailed service ===
==== 1861 ====
- Organized at Camp Harrison near Cincinnati on 20 April 1861, for three months service
- The men were mustered into federal service on 8 May. The regiment moved to Camp Dennison
- Organized June 20, 1861, at Camp Dennison near Cincinnati on 23 May, and was on duty there until 20 June
- Reorganized June 20, for three year service, at Camp Dennison, June 20
- Mustered into federal service June 20
- Moved by train to Grafton, WV, July 10
- Duty at Grafton, Clarksburg, Oakland, and Parkersburg, WV., until August 5
- Three months men who elected not to join the three-years regiment were mustered out on July 24, 1861
- Duty at Buckhannon, WV, until November 3
- Action at French Creek November 3 (Cos. "A," "B" and "C")
- Picket duty near Romney until January, 1862
- Action near Romney December 8

==== 1862 ====
- Expedition to Blue's Gap January 6-7
- Blue's Gap January 7
- At Paw Paw Tunnel until March
- Advance on Winchester March 7-15
- Reconnaissance to Strasburg, March 18-21.
- First Battle of Kernstown March 23
- Valley Turnpike between Strasburg and Staunton April 1-2
- Mt. Jackson, April 16
- March to Fredericksburg, May 12-21, and return to Front Royal, May 25-30
- Battle of Port Republic June 9
- Battle of Cedar Mountain August 9
- Pope's Campaign in Northern Virginia August 16-September 2
- Guard trains during the Second Battle of Bull Run August 28-30
- Maryland Campaign September 6-22
- Battle of Antietam September 16-17
- Moved to Harper's Ferry, WV, September 22, and duty Bolivar Heights until December
- Reconnaissance to Rippon November 9
- Reconnaissance to Winchester December 2-6
- March to Stafford Court House, VA, December 10-14
- Duty there until January 20, 1863
- Action at Dumfries, VA, December 27

==== 1863 ====
- Mud March January 20-24
- At Stafford Court House until April 27
- Chancellorsville Campaign April 27-May 6.
- Battle of Chancellorsville May 1-5
- Gettysburg Campaign June 11-July 24.
- Battle of Gettysburg July 2–4
- Pursuit of Lee to Manassas Gap, VA, July 5-24
- On detached duty at New York City to suppress riots, August 15 to September 16
- Transfer to Army of the Cumberland and moved to Bridgeport, AL, September 24-October 3
- Depart Culpeper on United States Military Railroad (USMRR) for Washington DC September 24
- Entrain at Washington September 25 and travel via Baltimore, MD; Columbus, OH; Indianapolis IN; Louisville, KY, and Nashville, TN
- Arrived Stevenson, AL, thence Bridgeport, October 3
- Reopening Tennessee River October 26-29
- Battle of Wauhatchie October 28-29
- Chattanooga-Ringgold Campaign November 23-27
- Lookout Mountain November 23-24
- Battle of Missionary Ridge November 25
- Ringgold Gap, Taylor's Ridge, November 27

==== 1864 ====
- Reconnaissance to Caperton's Ferry March 31-April 2
- Atlanta Campaign May 1-September 8
- Demonstration on Rocky Faced Ridge and Dalton May 8-11
- Dug Gap or Mill Creek May 8
- Battle of Resaca May 14-15
- Advance on Dallas May 18-25
- Cassville May 19
- Operations on line of Pumpkin Vine Creek and battles about Dallas, New Hope Church and Allatoona Hills May 25-June 5
- New Hope Church May 25
- Operations on line of Pumpkin Vine Creek and battles about Dallas, New Hope Church and Allatoona Hills May 26-June 5
- Operations about Marietta and against Kennesaw Mountain June 10-July 2
- Pine Hill June 11-14
- Gilgal or Golgotha Church June 15
- Muddy Creek June 17
- Noyes Creek June 19
- Kolb's Farm June 22.
- Assault on Kennesaw June 27
- Ruff's Station or Smyrna Camp Ground July 4
- Chattahoochie River July 5-17
- Buckhead, Nancy's Creek, July 18
- Peach Tree Creek July 19-20
- Siege of Atlanta July 22-August 25
- Operations at Chattahoochie River Bridge August 26-September 2
- Occupation of Atlanta September 2-November 15
- Near Atlanta November 9
- March to the Sea November 15-December 10
- Siege of Savannah December 10-21

==== 1865 ====
- Campaign of the Carolinas January to April
- North Edisto River February 12-13
- Battle of Bentonville, March 19-21
- Occupation of Goldsboro March 24
- Advance on Raleigh April 10-14
- Occupation of Raleigh April 14
- Bennett's House April 26, for surrender of Johnston and his army
- March to Washington, DC, via Richmond, VA, April 29-May 20
- Grand Review May 23
- Moved to Louisville, KY, June 6
- Mustered out July 26, 1865.

=== Casualties ===
The regiment lost a total of 203 men during service; 9 officers and 137 enlisted men killed or mortally wounded, 2 officers and 55 enlisted men died of disease.

== See also ==
- Ohio in the Civil War
