= 7th Ohio Infantry Regiment =

- Active: 1861–1864
- Country: United States
- Allegiance: Union
- Branch: Infantry
- Nickname: "Roosters"
- Engagements: Cross Lanes; Kernstown; Port Republic; Cedar Mountain; Antietam; Dumfries; Chancellorsville; Gettysburg; Lookout Mountain; Missionary Ridge; Ringgold; Rocky Face Ridge; Resaca

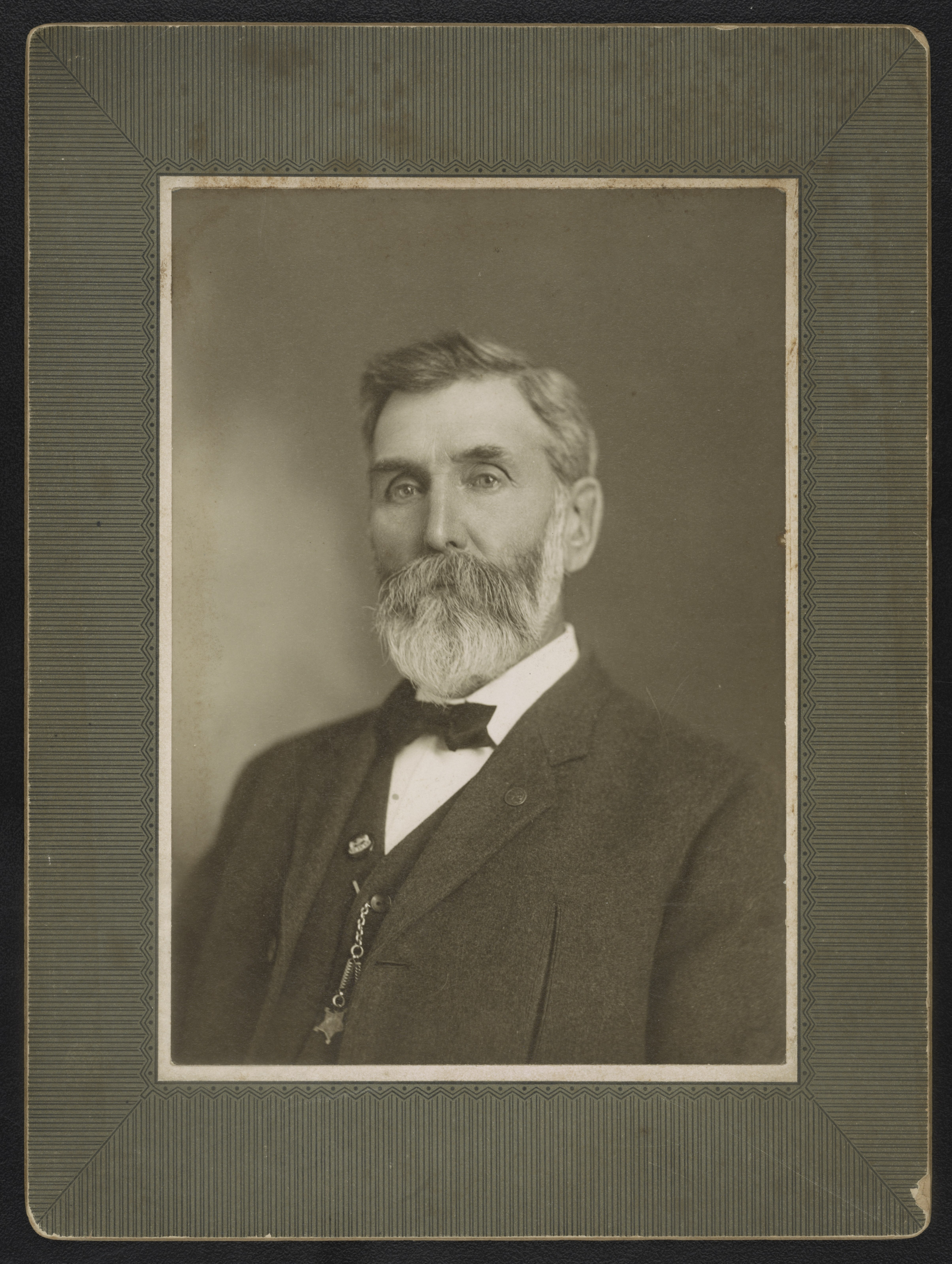
Hiram G. McQuiston, veteran of Co. H, 7th Ohio Infantry Regiment and Co. and Co. K, 6th Regular Army Cavalry Regiment with G.A.R. watch chain and lapel pin. From the Liljenquist Family Collection of Civil War Photographs, Prints and Photographs Division, Library of Congress

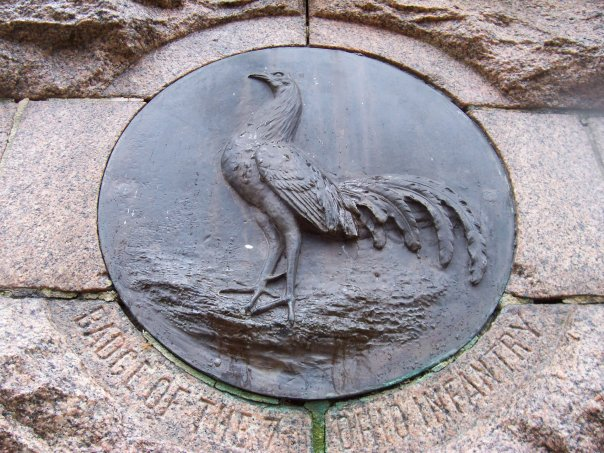
Regimental badge

The 7th Ohio Infantry Regiment was an infantry regiment formed in northeastern Ohio for service in the Union Army during the American Civil War. It served in the Eastern Theater in a number of campaigns and battles with the Army of Virginia and the Army of the Potomac, and was then transferred to the Western Theater, where it joined the Army of the Cumberland besieged at Chattanooga. It was noted for its holding the high ground at the center of the line at Antietam as part of Tyndale's 1st Brigade, Greene's 2nd Division of Mansfield's XII Corps. It is of the 7th regiment that a war historian wrote, "All in all, considering the number of its battles, its marches, its losses, its conduct in action, it may be safely said that not a single regiment in the United States gained more lasting honor or deserved better of its country than the Seventh Ohio Volunteer Infantry."

== Three-months regiment ==
On 27 April 1861, orders were given to form the 7th Ohio Infantry Regiment from independent companies gathered at Camp Taylor in Cleveland.

The regiment elected its own field officers, and Erastus B. Tyler of Ravenna became colonel, William R. Creighton of Cleveland as lieutenant colonel, and John S. Casement of Painesville as major. Among the original officers was Captain John W. Sprague of Sandusky; he would later be a brigadier general and Medal of Honor recipient while serving in the 63rd Ohio Infantry.

On 6 May 1861, the Seventh left Camp Taylor and traveled to Cincinnati, where the new soldiers trained at Camp Dennison. In mid-June, the term of enlistment expired, and the men were asked to re-enlist for three-years' service. The vast majority did so, with their ranks augmented by fresh recruits.

== Three-years regiment ==
=== Western Virginia ===
On 26 June 1861, the reconstituted regiment departed Camp Dennison for western Virginia, where the men would see their first action of the war. On 26 August, Brig. Gen. John B. Floyd, commanding Confederate forces in the Kanawha Valley, crossed the Gauley River to attack the 7th Ohio Infantry encamped at Kessler's Cross Lanes. The 7th was surprised and routed with severe loss, the two wings of Tyler's line retreating in opposite directions. Throughout the rout and carnage Major Jack Casement, at the head of Tyler's left wing, commenced a retrograde march through Confederate territory over mountain ranges and rivers to Charleston, West Virginia without the capture of a single man. Floyd then withdrew to the river and took up a defensive position at Carnifex Ferry. During the month, General Robert E. Lee arrived in western Virginia and attempted to coordinate his forces. On 13 November, the Seventh was involved in fighting at Cotton Hill.

=== Virginia ===
On 5 January 1862, the regiment was engaged at the Blue's Gap Affair. On 23 March, it was at Kernstown, the opening battle of Confederate Maj. Gen. Thomas J. "Stonewall" Jackson's campaign through the Shenandoah Valley. The battle was a Union victory, later proving to be Jackson's only defeat in the war. The last battle of Jackson's Valley Campaign was the Battle of Port Republic, which took place on 9 June. Here, the Seventh fought very effectively. With less than three thousand muskets, Jackson's force of fourteen thousand was held at bay for five hours. The Union forces however, were finally forced to retreat.

On 5 July, the regiment was issued new Model 1861 Springfield rifles to replace the obsolete Model 1816 muskets they had been carrying until then.

On 9 August, at the Battle of Cedar Mountain, the regiment was again at the front and engaged in a fierce hand-to-hand conflict. Of the three hundred men engaged, only one hundred escaped unhurt. The Seventh suffered more than any other Union regiment in this battle. On 21 August, the men experienced a brief engagement at Snicker's Gap. During the subsequent campaign, which lasted until 2 September and culminated in the Second Battle of Manassas, the Seventh was held in reserve guarding the railroads.

=== Antietam ===
On 17 September 1862, the 7th Ohio Infantry made the farthest advance of any Union regiment. With Tyndale's brigade of Greene's division, they first formed in the East Woods and came upon a line of Confederates. After the rebels were driven back, Tyndale's brigade began their movement at the edge of the Cornfield and proceeded through the fields along Smoketown Road until they were in front of the Dunker Church. They then moved forward into the West Woods, contesting the enemy. After the altercation, the division and brigade were forced to withdraw, leaving all of the ground they had gained. This was reflective of most Union units at Antietam.

After the battle, the Confederate army retreated back across the Potomac River and into Virginia. During the hesitant march south against Lee and his army, the Seventh camped at Loudoun Heights and then Bolivar Heights near Harpers Ferry.

=== Chancellorsville ===
The Seventh crossed the Rapidan River at Germanna Ford on 30 April 1863, and advanced to Chancellorsville by way of the Germanna Plank Road and Orange Plank Road. It took position just south of the Chancellor house, in support of a Union artillery battery that had unlimbered just across the intersection from the house. On 1 May, along with the rest of the 12th Corps, it moved eastward along the Plank Road. In the vicinity of the Catharpin Road, it encountered Stonewall Jackson's Confederates. In the evening, it beat off a probing attack by Confederate troops up the Plank Road.

During Jackson's famous flank march on 2 May, the Seventh held its position near the Chancellor house and did not take part in this action. The Confederates renewed their attacks the following morning, and the regiment found itself in a crossfire from Major General Lafayette McLaws' Confederates, who were attacking it from the east, and from Jackson's men attacking from the west. The converging fire from Confederate artillery batteries contributed to the Buckeye regiment's casualties. By 10 a.m., Hooker decided to retreat. Candy's brigade fell back through the regiment, which, along with several other regiments, helped cover the withdrawal. Once the rest of the army had fallen back, the Seventh joined the retreat, passing through the Chancellorsville clearing and retreating to a point on the United States Ford Road about two miles north of the battlefield. It moved back to the front later that afternoon, occupying a point near the apex of Hooker's final line. That evening, Hooker reshuffled his line, placing the Twelfth Corps on his left flank, next to the Rappahannock River. The regiment was among the last regiments to retreat, crossing the river just before daylight on 6 May.

=== Gettysburg ===
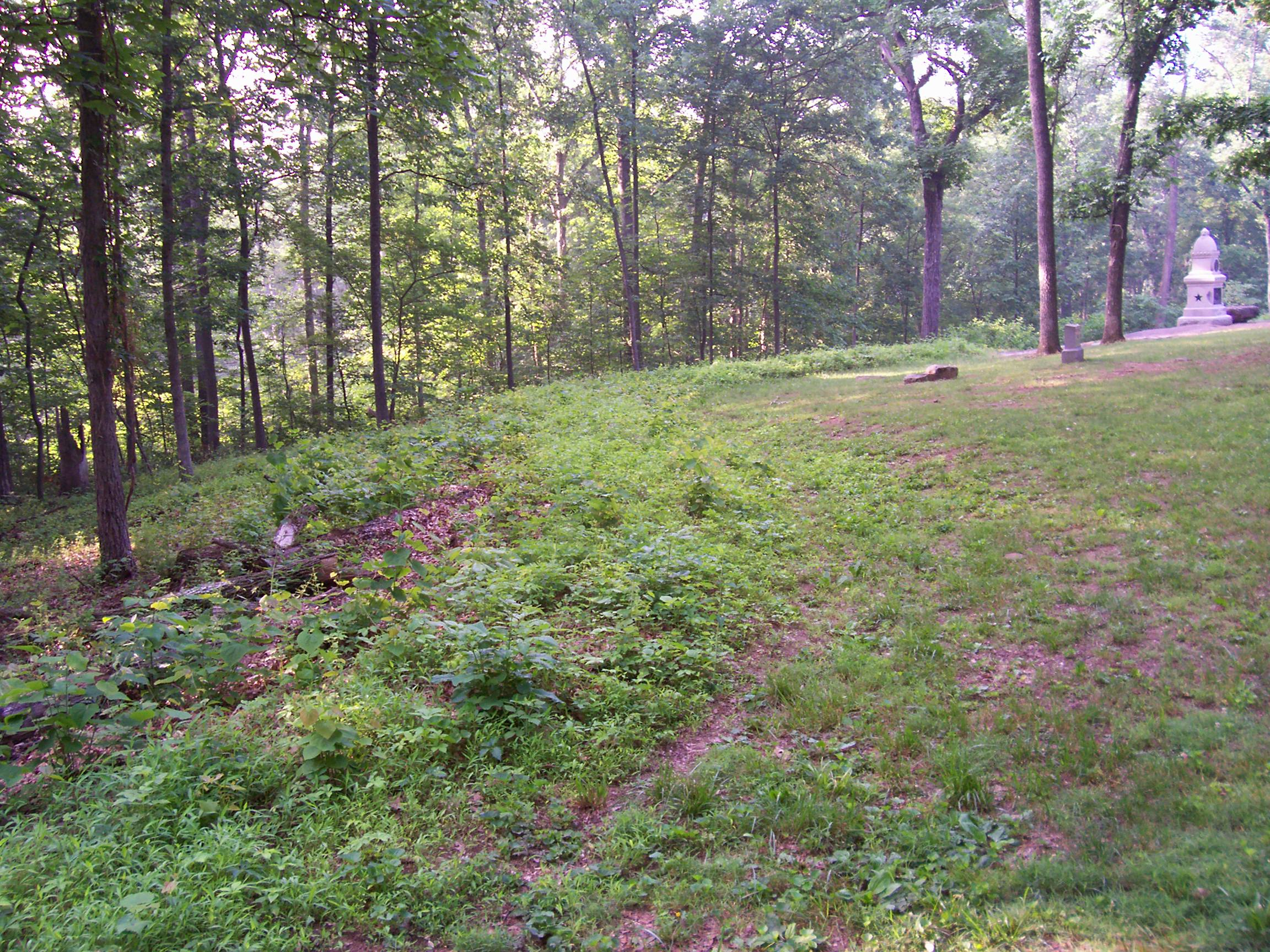
Position of the 7th Ohio on Culp's Hill on 3 July 1863.

The 7th Ohio Infantry arrived on the fields near Gettysburg in the late afternoon of 1 July 1863. They camped in the area of Little Round Top for the night. On 2 July, they were sent to Culp's Hill and helped build breastworks with the rest of the division. Later in the day, the division was sent to the southern end of the battlefield to support the Union left. They ended up getting lost along Baltimore Pike and never reached the area they intended. That night, they returned to Culp's Hill.

On 3 July, at about 6 a.m., the Seventh was chosen to relieve the 60th New York at the left of Greene's line. It would be the first time the regiment had ever fought behind breastworks. Sherman R. Norris of Company D found that the Rebel formation in the 7th Ohio Infantry's front "melted away before our volleys, and after they had been broken, numbers of the enemy took refuge behind trees and rocks." At 8 a.m., the 60th New York again exchanged places with the 7th Ohio Infantry. Creighton's Ohioans were back in the breastworks by 9:45 a.m., relieving an unspecified regiment to the left of the 29th Ohio. This is when Confederate Maj. Gen. Edward Johnson flung his last assault at Culp's Hill. Among the attacking Confederates were the five regiments of the vaunted Stonewall Brigade. After an attempt to storm the right center of Greene's line, some Rebels became stranded on the hillside.

About 11:00 a.m., Creighton noticed a makeshift white flag thrown out from behind rocks in front of the 7th Ohio Infantry's entrenchments. He shouted for his men to stop shooting. The Buckeyes then observed a mounted officer in gray at the foot of the hill. He spurred his horse forward hoping to stop any attempt of surrender. Partway up the slope, he was met by a fusillade of bullets. Rider and horse both tumbled to the ground, dead. The officer proved to be Maj. Benjamin W. Leigh Jr., Johnson's chief of staff. Afterwards, 78 Rebel soldiers surrendered to the 7th Ohio Infantry, many of them members of the 4th Virginia Infantry. The next morning, Company H Corporal John Pollock climbed over the works and picked up the 4th Virginia's rumpled colors, one of three battle flags captured by Geary's division at Culp's Hill.

Gettysburg was the last battle for the 7th Ohio Infantry in the Army of the Potomac. After pursuing the Army of Northern Virginia back into Virginia, the 11th and 12th corps were transferred west as reinforcements in order to support the besieged Union Army of the Cumberland in Chattanooga, Tennessee. They were placed under the command of Joseph Hooker. (Note: The route began on the United States Military Railroad (USMRR) in Virginia before transitioning to the Baltimore & Ohio RR from Washington to Columbus, the Columbus, Piqua and Indiana Railroad (CP&I) and Indiana Central Railway to Indianapolis, the Louisville, New Albany and Chicago Railroad (LNA&C) to Louisville, the Louisville & Nashville Railroad (L&N) to Nashville, and finally using the Nashville & Chattanooga Railway (N&CR) to reach Bridgeport. Hooker's command traveled 1,200 miles from Virginia to Knoxville in eleven and a half days with two corps of 20,000 men arriving intact with all arms and supplies. In contrast, Longstreet's 12,000 troops arrived piecemeal after a twelve-day 800-mile journey with fifteen different railroads. The Rebels' original plan of four-days travel over five railroads and 540 miles had been scuttled by the Burnside's capture of Knoxville cutting the East Tennessee and Virginia Railroad.)

=== Chattanooga ===
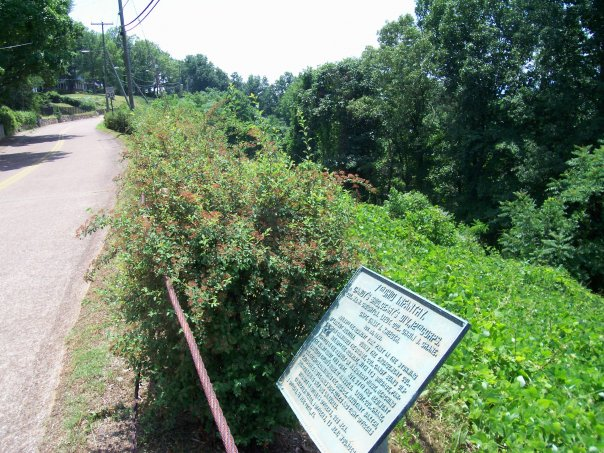
Reached the summit of Missionary Ridge at about this point. The regiment's descriptive tablet lies in the foreground.

On 24 November 1863, the regiment marched with Geary's Division from Wauhatchie early in the morning, crossed Lookout Creek about 9:30 a.m. and formed the left of Geary's line when the latter was formed for advance toward the northern slope of Lookout Mountain. Ireland's brigade was on their right about 50 paces in front, a march of a mile and a quarter uncovered the fords by which Grose's Brigade of Cruft's Division joined the left of the line. In the general attack, they pushed on to Cravens' house, and continued in action on the front line throughout the afternoon, and then participated in the heavy skirmishing of the night.

The next day, they were in the pursuit of the Confederates towards the Rossville Gap on Missionary Ridge. They captured many men and guns without losing a single man in the regiment. On 27 November, with General Hooker, the Seventh charged up a series of hills in which the Confederates were holding called Taylor's Ridge in the battle of Ringgold. In this battle, the Seventh lost their colonel, William R. Creighton, as well as many officers and many of their men. This would be the Seventh's harshest experience throughout the war.

Once the campaign concluded and the siege had been lifted, the Seventh encamped at Chattanooga for the winter.

=== Atlanta Campaign ===
The 7th Ohio Infantry joined the campaign against Atlanta on 1 May 1864. First, it had an engagement at Rocky Face Ridge from 8–11 May. Then they took part in the Battle of Resaca on the 14th and 15th. Next, it had an engagement at Cassville on the 19th and then participated in reconnaissance at Pumpkin Vine Creek on the 25th. Later that day, they were in the Battle of Dallas and in the engagement at New Hope Church. Finally on 5 June, they fought at Allatoona Hills. Before Sherman's forces entered Atlanta, the Seventh was removed from the front because their three-year term of service had reached its expiration.

=== Withdrawal ===
On 11 July 1864, with the regiment's term of enlistment having expired, men who wished to continue serving in the army were transferred to the 5th Ohio, while the others left the front for their withdrawal from active service. The regiment was mustered out in Cleveland on 6–7 July.

== Affiliations, battle honors, detailed service, and casualties ==
=== Organizational affiliation ===
Attached to:

- Railroad District, West Virginia, to January, 1862
- 3rd Brigade, Landers' Division, Army of the Potomac (AoP), to March, 1862.
- 3rd Brigade, Shields' 2nd Division, Banks' V Corps, Department of the Shenandoah, to May 1862.
- 2nd Brigade, Shields' Division, Department of the Rappahannock, to June, 1862
- 2nd Brigade, 1st Division, II Corps, Pope's Army of Virginia (AoV), to August, 1862
- 2nd Brigade, 1st Division, II Corps, AoV, to September, 1862
- 1st Brigade, 2nd Division, XII Corps, Army of the Potomac (AoP), to October, 1863
- 1st Brigade, 2nd Division, XII Corps, Army of the Cumberland (AoC), to April, 1864
- 1st Brigade, 2nd Division, XX Corps, AoC, to June, 1864

=== List of battles ===
The official list of battles in which the regiment bore a part:

- Battle of Kessler's Cross Lanes
- First Battle of Kernstown
- Port Republic
- Battle of Cedar Mountain
- Battle of Antietam
- Battle of Dumfries
- Battle of Chancellorsville
- Battle of Gettysburg
- Battle of Wauhatchie
- Battle of Lookout Mountain
- Battle of Missionary Ridge
- Battle of Ringgold Gap
- Battle of Rocky Face Ridge
- Battle of Resaca

=== Detailed service ===
==== 1861 ====
- Organized at Camp Taylor in Cleveland on 27 April 1861, for three months service
- The men were mustered into federal service on May 6. The regiment moved to Camp Dennison near Cincinnati
- Reorganized June 20, for three year service, at Camp Dennison, June 20
- Mustered into federal service and three months men who elected not to join the three-years regiment were mustered out June 20
- Moved by train to Clarksburg, WV, June 26, arriving there June 29
- Expedition to Weston, WV, June 29-30
- Relief of Glenville July 5
- Advance to Sutton and Cross Lanes July 7-August 15
- Moved to Gauley Bridge August 21-22
- Cross Lanes, near Summerville, August 26
- At Charleston till November
- Operations in the Kanawha Valley October 19-November 16
- Expedition to Loop Creek and Fayettevllle November 1-15
- McCoy's Mills November 15.

==== 1862 ====
- Expedition to Blue's Gap January 6-7
- Blue's Gap January 7
- Duty at Hampton Heights and at Paw Paw Tunnel until March 7
- Advance on Winchester March 7-15
- Reconnaissance to Strasburg, March 18-21.
- First Battle of Kernstown March 22-23
- Monterey April 12
- March to Fredericksburg, May 12-21, and return to Front Royal, May 25-30
- Battle of Port Republic June 9
- Battle of Cedar Mountain August 9
- Pope's Campaign in Northern Virginia August 16-September 2
- Guard trains during the Second Battle of Bull Run August 28-30
- Maryland Campaign September 6-22
- Battle of Antietam September 16-17
- Moved to Harper's Ferry, WV, September 22, and duty Bolivar Heights until December
- Reconnaissance to Rippon November 9
- Reconnaissance to Charleston December 1-6
- March to Stafford Court House, VA, December 10-14
- Duty there until January 20, 1863
- Action at Dumfries, VA, December 29

==== 1863 ====
- Mud March January 20-24
- At Stafford Court House until April 27
- Chancellorsville Campaign April 27-May 6.
- Battle of Chancellorsville May 1-5
- Gettysburg Campaign June 11-July 24.
- Battle of Gettysburg July 2–4
- Pursuit of Lee to Manassas Gap, VA, July 5-24
- On detached duty at New York City to suppress riots, August 15 to September 16
- Transfer to Army of the Cumberland and moved to Bridgeport, AL, September 24-October 3
- Depart Culpeper on United States Military Railroad (USMRR) for Washington DC September 24
- Entrain at Washington September 25 and travel via Baltimore, MD; Columbus, OH; Indianapolis IN; Louisville, KY, and Nashville, TN
- Arrived Stevenson, AL, thence Bridgeport, October 3
- Garrison's Creek, near Fosterville, October 6 (Detachment)
- Reopening Tennessee River October 26-29
- Battle of Wauhatchie October 28-29
- Chattanooga-Ringgold Campaign November 23-27
- Lookout Mountain November 23-24
- Battle of Missionary Ridge November 25
- Ringgold Gap, Taylor's Ridge, November 27

==== 1864 ====
- At Bridgeport, till May
- Atlanta Campaign May 1-June 11
- Demonstration on Rocky Faced Ridge and Dalton May 8-11
- Dug Gap or Mill Creek May 8
- Battle of Resaca May 14-15
- Advance on Dallas May 18-25
- Near Cassville May 19
- New Hope Church May 25
- Operations on line of Pumpkin Vine Creek and battles about Dallas, New Hope Church and Allatoona Hills May 26-June 5
- Left front for muster out June 11
- Veterans and Recruits transferred to 5th Ohio Infantry
- Mustered out July 6, 1864, expiration of term

=== Casualties ===
The regiment lost a total of 273 men during service; 10 officers and 174 enlisted men killed or mortally wounded, 2 officers and 87 enlisted men died of disease.

== Commemoration ==
On 4 May 1885, the Ohio General Assembly passed an Act "To appropriate money to purchase land upon which to erect a monument to the memory of the soldiers of Ohio who died upon the battlefield of Gettysburg." The Act appropriated $5,000 to be spent for the purpose under the direction of the Battlefield Memorial Commission. To see that this Act would be carried out in the best means, a meeting of the surviving Ohio soldiers was held at the State Capitol on 4 July 1885. At that same meeting, it was agreed upon that a committee would accompany the Adjutant-General to Gettysburg, and assist him in locating the positions in which Ohio troops fought.

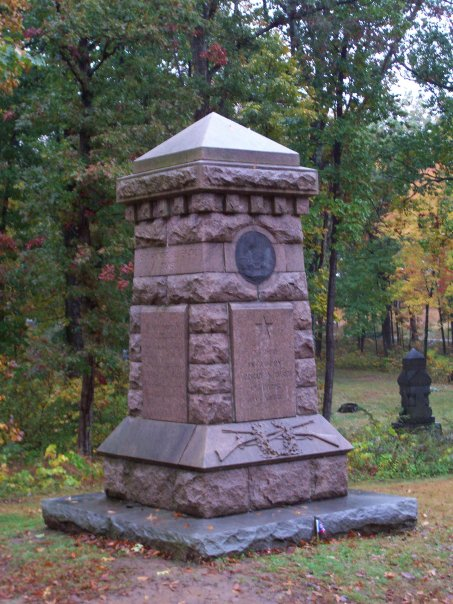
The monument as it appears today.

After inspecting the field, the committee declared that $2,000 would be appropriated for each Ohio regiment, battery, or other organization which took part in the battle. This sum would be for the proper placement of monuments and tablets, and for keeping the grounds and memorials in good condition. On 15 and 16 July 1886, after careful inspection and examination of the positions occupied by Ohio organizations during the battle, it was decided that each organization should have its own special monument. No two would be alike in pattern and design, and each would be $1,500. On 14 September 1887, they were formally dedicated and turned over to the Gettysburg Battlefield Commission for future care and protection.

The 7th Ohio Infantry's monument is located near Gettysburg, Pennsylvania in Adams County. It is a simple stone structure located at the intersection of Slocum Avenue and Williams Avenue, on the right when traveling north on Slocum Avenue. It lies on the "saddle" between the lower and upper crest of Culp's Hill in Gettysburg National Military Park. Dedicated on 14 September 1887, it marks the position held by the regiment on 2 and 3 July 1863. It is vertical with mostly rough-hewn surfaces and an apexed top. There is a polished inscription stone on each one of its sides. On two faces, towards the top, are State Seal and unit reliefs. A relief of crossed muskets with a wreath in the center is on the lower front sloped surface. A Corps star insignia appears on the top of the front inscription tablet. It was constructed by Smith Granite Company.

(Front) - 7th Ohio Infantry – 1st Brigade 2d Division – 12th Corps – 1, 2 July 3, 1863

(Left) - Dulce et Decorum est Pro Patria Mori – 7th Ohio Infantry – Arrived near Little Round Top evening of 1 July on 2 July, held positions on Culp's Hill from morning until 6 p.m. then moved with Brigade to support the left. Returned at midnight to Culp's Hill and remained there until the close of the battle.

(Back) - 7th Ohio Infantry – Mustered in for – 3 months 30 April 1861 – Mustered in for – 3 years 21 June 1861 – Mustered out in June 1864

(Right) - Ohio honors her brave sons – 7th Ohio Infantry – Served with the national armies in Virginia and the Antietam and Gettysburg Campaigns. Was transferred in September 1863 to the Army of the Cumberland and served with that Army until June 1864.

Today, the lineage and honors of the 7th Ohio Infantry are carried on by the 145th Armored Regiment, Ohio National Guard.
