= 103rd Ohio Volunteer Infantry Association Barracks =

- U.S. National Register of Historic Places
- Location within Ohio Location within the United States
- Location: Sheffield Lake, Ohio
- Coordinates: 41°29′58.43″N 82°4′10.60″W
- NRHP reference No.: 78002115
- Added to NRHP: July 14, 1978

103rd Ohio Volunteer Infantry Association Barracks is a registered historic building in Sheffield Lake, Ohio. It was listed in the National Register of Historic Places on July 14, 1978.

The 103rd Ohio Infantry served during the American Civil War. 103rd Ohio Infantry members built and used the barracks to hold reunions after the war.

== 103rd Ohio Volunteer Infantry Museum ==
The 103rd O.V.I. Memorial Foundation, composed of descendants of the 103rd Ohio Infantry, owns the building and operates the 103rd Ohio Volunteer Infantry Museum in the building. Displays include Civil War relics and artifacts, including diaries and letters. The museum is open by appointment.
