= Erastus B. Tyler =

General in the Union Army during the American Civil War

Erastus Tyler
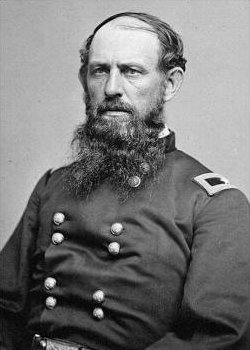
- Brig. Gen. Erastus B. Tyler
- Born: April 24, 1822; West Bloomfield, New York
- Died: January 9, 1891 (aged 68); Baltimore, Maryland
- Burial place: Green Mount Cemetery, Baltimore, Maryland
- Military career
- Allegiance: United States of America
- Branch: United States Army
- Service years: 1861–1865
- Rank: Brevet Major General
- Commands: VIII Corps (briefly); 7th Ohio Volunteer Infantry; 1st Brigade, 3rd Division, V Corps
- Conflicts: American Civil War: Battle of Kessler's Cross Lanes; First Battle of Kernstown; First Battle of Winchester; Battle of Port Republic; Battle of Fredericksburg; Battle of Chancellorsville; Battle of Monocacy
- Other work: Postmaster of Baltimore

Erastus Bernard Tyler (April 24, 1822 – January 9, 1891) was an American businessman, merchant, and soldier. He was a general in the Union Army during the American Civil War and fought in many of the early battles in the Eastern Theater before being assigned command of the defenses of Baltimore, Maryland. He briefly commanded the VIII Corps.

== Early life and career ==
Erastus B. Tyler was born in West Bloomfield, New York, and was educated in the common schools. As a young man, he moved to Ravenna, Ohio, and graduated from what was then known as Granville College (now Denison University). At the age of 23, he opened a successful business as a fur merchant in western Virginia.

== Civil War service ==
With the outbreak of the Civil War, Tyler helped raise and recruit the 7th Ohio Volunteer Infantry in northeastern Ohio. He was elected as the regiment's first colonel, with John S. Casement as major. After initial training and organization, Tyler and the 7th OVI were sent to western Virginia in August 1861. At the Battle of Kessler's Cross Lanes on August 26, Tyler's raw regiment was surprised in its camp by a Confederate brigade commanded by Brigadier General John B. Floyd, which had crossed the Gauley River unseen and attacked. Pressed by a numerically superior and more experienced enemy, the 7th withdrew and then routed from the field.

In early 1862, General Frederick W. Lander gave Tyler command of a brigade, which was later assigned to the division commanded by James Shields and later Nathan Kimball. Tyler was promoted to the rank of brigadier general on May 14. His brigade was involved in several engagements during the Valley Campaign against the Confederates of Stonewall Jackson, including the First Battle of Winchester. Tyler was in command of the Union forces engaged at the Battle of Port Republic. In one of the most hotly contested and bloodiest battles of the campaign, Jackson forced Tyler to withdraw.

With the reorganization of the Army of the Potomac following the Northern Virginia Campaign, Tyler was given command of the 1st Brigade, 3rd Division, in the V Corps. Tyler's Brigade was involved in the Maryland Campaign and the Battle of Fredericksburg, as well as the Mud March before going into winter quarters. His troops were a part of the unsuccessful series of attacks on well-entrenched Confederates on Marye's Heights at Fredericksburg. Tyler suffered a wound and lost a significant portion of his brigade in the fifth wave of Union attackers.

In the spring of 1863, Tyler was again in combat at the Battle of Chancellorsville. His brigade played a role in helping to stabilize the right flank of the Union III Corps by countering an assault by the Georgia brigade of Alfred Colquitt in dense woods that made it difficult for the two sides to see each other. The Federals continued until Tyler's ammunition grew scarce and Confederate reinforcements turned the Federal right flank.

Shortly after the battle, three of the four regiments in his brigade mustered out of the army, their terms of enlistment having expired. Left without a field command, Tyler returned to Washington, D.C. to await further orders. In June, he was assigned command of the defenses of Baltimore, Maryland. He remained stationed there for the rest of the war and married a local woman. He was in command of the VIII Corps from September 28, 1863 – October 10, 1863, succeeding Robert C. Schenck.

During the Battle of Monocacy in July 1864, Tyler commanded two regiments of inexperienced Hundred Days Men that successfully held off numerous Confederate attempts to capture the Jug Bridge on the Baltimore Pike. The bridge was of great strategic importance as it protected the Union's extreme right flank. It was also the route used by the Union army in their subsequent retreat toward Baltimore.

As the war ended, Tyler was included in the omnibus list of promotions to recognize Union officers for their "gallant and meritorious service." He received the brevet rank of major general, dating from March 1865. On August 24, 1865, he was mustered out of the army.

== Postbellum career ==
Tyler and his wife remained in Baltimore after the war and raised a family. He rose to social prominence and served a term as the city's postmaster, a patronage position.

Erastus Tyler died at the age of 68 and was buried in Baltimore's Green Mount Cemetery.

== See also ==
- List of American Civil War generals (Union)
- List of Ohio's American Civil War generals
- Ohio in the American Civil War

== Notes ==
Military offices
Preceded by William W. Morris	Commander of the VIII Corps (ACW); September 28, 1863 - October 10, 1863	Succeeded by Robert C. Schenck
