= Joshua Hall Bates =

American politician

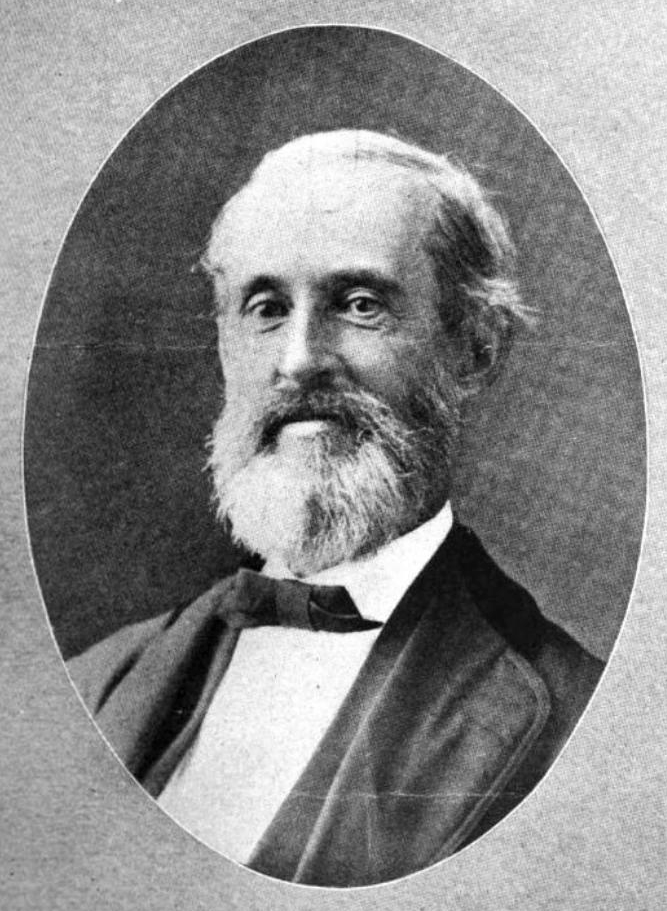
- Born: March 5, 1817; Boston, Massachusetts
- Died: July 26, 1908 (aged 91); Cincinnati, Ohio
- Burial place: Spring Grove Cemetery
- Military career
- Allegiance: United States of America; Union
- Branch: United States Army; Ohio state militia (Union)
- Service years: 1837–1842; 1861
- Rank: Brigadier General (Ohio State Militia)
- Conflicts: American Civil War • No combat duty

Joshua Hall Bates (March 5, 1817 – July 26, 1908) was a lawyer, politician, and Ohio militia general in service to the Union during the early part of the American Civil War. He was a leading recruiter and organizer of many of the first regiments of Ohio troops who volunteered after President Abraham Lincoln's call to arms in the spring of 1861.

== Birth and early years ==
Bates was born on March 5, 1817, in Boston, Massachusetts. His father was physician George Bates who was a friend of Andrew Jackson, and mother was Eliza Hall. He graduated from the United States Military Academy on July 1, 1837, and was breveted as a second lieutenant in the artillery. He subsequently served five years in the Regular army, including spending time in Florida in 1837-38 during the Seminole Wars. He was assigned to Cleveland, Ohio, during the Canada border disturbances from 1839 to 1841. After resigning his commission on July 20, 1842, he moved to Cincinnati, Ohio, where he studied law and was admitted to the bar.

On May 8, 1844, he married Elizabeth Dwight Hoadley of the New England Dwight family. Her father was Ohio politician George Hoadley (1781–1857) and brother was George Hoadly who later became Governor of Ohio. Their children were:

1. Clement Bates born April 1, 1845
2. Charles Jarvis Bates born November 5, 1847
3. William Scarborough Bates born February 7, 1852
4. Merrick Linley Bates born June 14, 1855
5. James Harvey Simpson Bates born August 28, 1863

== Civil War service ==
Bates joined the Ohio state militia and became a brigadier general on April 27, 1861. He was assigned to the Department of the Sanitary Commission and served as the commander of Camp Harrison near Cincinnati. Along with two other militia generals, he helped establish Camp Dennison, a sprawling military complex north of Cincinnati. He helped organize fifteen regiments of infantry for service in the field. Believing that he was too old at age forty-four to go into combat, Bates resigned his commission as brigadier general of Ohio militia on August 27, 1861.

As president of the Cincinnati Committee of Public Safety, Bates commanded a division when Cincinnati was threatened by Confederates forces in the summer of 1863. One of the earthwork fortifications in northern Kentucky which defended Cincinnati was named Bates Battery in his honor.

Again returning to civilian life, Bates resumed his law practice in Cincinnati. He became a member of the Ohio State Senate in 1864 and served until 1866. He was again a state senator from 1876 to 1878. He was the president of the Cincinnati Bar Association from 1881 to 1882.

In 1892 General Bates joined the Aztec Club of 1847 as an hereditary member by virtue of the service of his father Surgeon Charles J. Bates, USN. He was also a Veteran companion of the Military Order of the Loyal Legion of the United States.

Bates died on July 26, 1908, in Cincinnati at the age of 91. He is among several former Union Army generals who were buried in the city's Spring Grove Cemetery.
