= Ripon Lodge =

Historic house in West Virginia, United States

- U.S. National Register of Historic Places
- U.S. Historic district
- Location within West Virginia Location within the United States
- Location: Rippon, West Virginia
- Coordinates: 39°13′21″N 77°54′30″W
- NRHP reference No.: 98001074
- Added to NRHP: August 31, 1998

Ripon Lodge, located near the village of Rippon, West Virginia, was built in 1833 by Henry S. Turner on his "Wheatland" estate. The next year his son, William F. Turner, inherited Ripon Lodge. The house is a two-story T-shaped stone building with a detached 1 1/2-story stone summer kitchen. The interior contains an elegant half-spiral curving stairway to the second floor.

The Lodge was added to the National Register of Historic Places in 1984.
