= John S. Casement =

American civil engineer and Army general (1829–1909)

John Stephen Casement
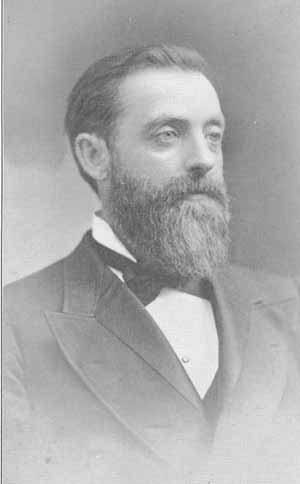
- Born: January 19, 1829; Geneva, New York, US
- Died: December 13, 1909 (aged 80); Painesville, Ohio, US
- Burial place: Evergreen Cemetery, Painesville, Ohio
- Military career
- Allegiance: United States of America; Union
- Branch: United States Army; Union Army
- Service years: 1861 – 1865
- Rank: Brevet Brigadier General
- Nickname: "General Jack"
- Unit: 103rd Ohio Volunteer Infantry
- Commands: 2nd Brigade, 3rd Division, XXIII Corps.
- Conflicts: American Civil War; Siege of Knoxville; Atlanta campaign; Battle of Franklin; Battle of Nashville; Battle of Wilmington
- Other work: Directed the Union Pacific work crews during construction of the Transcontinental Railroad

John Stephen Casement (January 19, 1829 – December 13, 1909) was a general and brigade commander in the Union Army during the American Civil War and a noted railroad contractor and civil engineer. He directed the construction of the Union Pacific's section of the Transcontinental Railroad, which linked the Western United States with the East.

== Early life and career ==
John S. Casement was born in Geneva, New York on January 19, 1829, to Robert Casement (1795-1849) and Anna Curphey (1794-1878) who were themselves of Manx descent from the Isle of Man. John had a brother, Daniel T Casement. Casement's education was mostly self-acquired.

Casement married Frances Marion Jennings (1840-1928), a native of Painesville, Ohio on October 15, 1857, in Lake County, Ohio. They had three sons, Charles J. (1861-1865) John Frank (1866-1886) and Dan Dillon Casement (1868-1953) . His son Dan, first graduated from Western Reserve Academy in 1886 and was also a civil engineer, graduating from Princeton University in 1890.

In 1878, Casement bought Juniata farm, near Manhattan, Kansas which his son, Dan operated from 1889 until his death in 1953.

=== Railroad contractor ===
In 1844, the family moved from New York to Michigan where Casement started his railroad career with the Michigan Central railroad as a laborer on the track gang. In 1850, he relocated to Ohio to work on the Cleveland, Columbus and Cincinnati Railroad as foreman and then moving on to the Lake Shore railroad in the same capacity as a foreman of the track gang ballasting track, finishing in 1852. He then went into railroad contracting in the Spring of 1853 largely working the double tracking of the Lake Shore railroad, Grand Trunk. In the early 1860s, Casement and his future business partner, brother Dan contracted for trackwork on the Sunbury and Erie Railroad as well as the Erie and Pittsburgh railroads. With the outbreak of the American Civil War, Casement turned over management of the business to his brother, Daniel and entered military service with the Ohio Voluntary Infantry.

== Civil War ==
Soon after the beginning of the War with Fort Sumter, Casement volunteered for ninety days militia service with the Seventh Ohio Volunteer Infantry. He was also elected major of the regiment. Following his ninety days, he re-enlisted for three years. Casement's first battle was at Kessler's Cross Lanes, Virginia on August 26, 1861. Although the Union forces were surprised and routed with severe loss, Casement, at the head of the Union left wing, commenced a retrograde march through Confederate territory over mountain ranges and rivers to Charleston, West Virginia without the capture of a man. Casement also served in the Shenandoah Valley against Confederates under Stonewall Jackson. After his heroic actions at the First Battle of Kernstown near Winchester Virginia, March 23, 1862, Casement was appointed colonel of the newly formed 103rd Ohio Volunteer Infantry and fought in the operations around Knoxville.

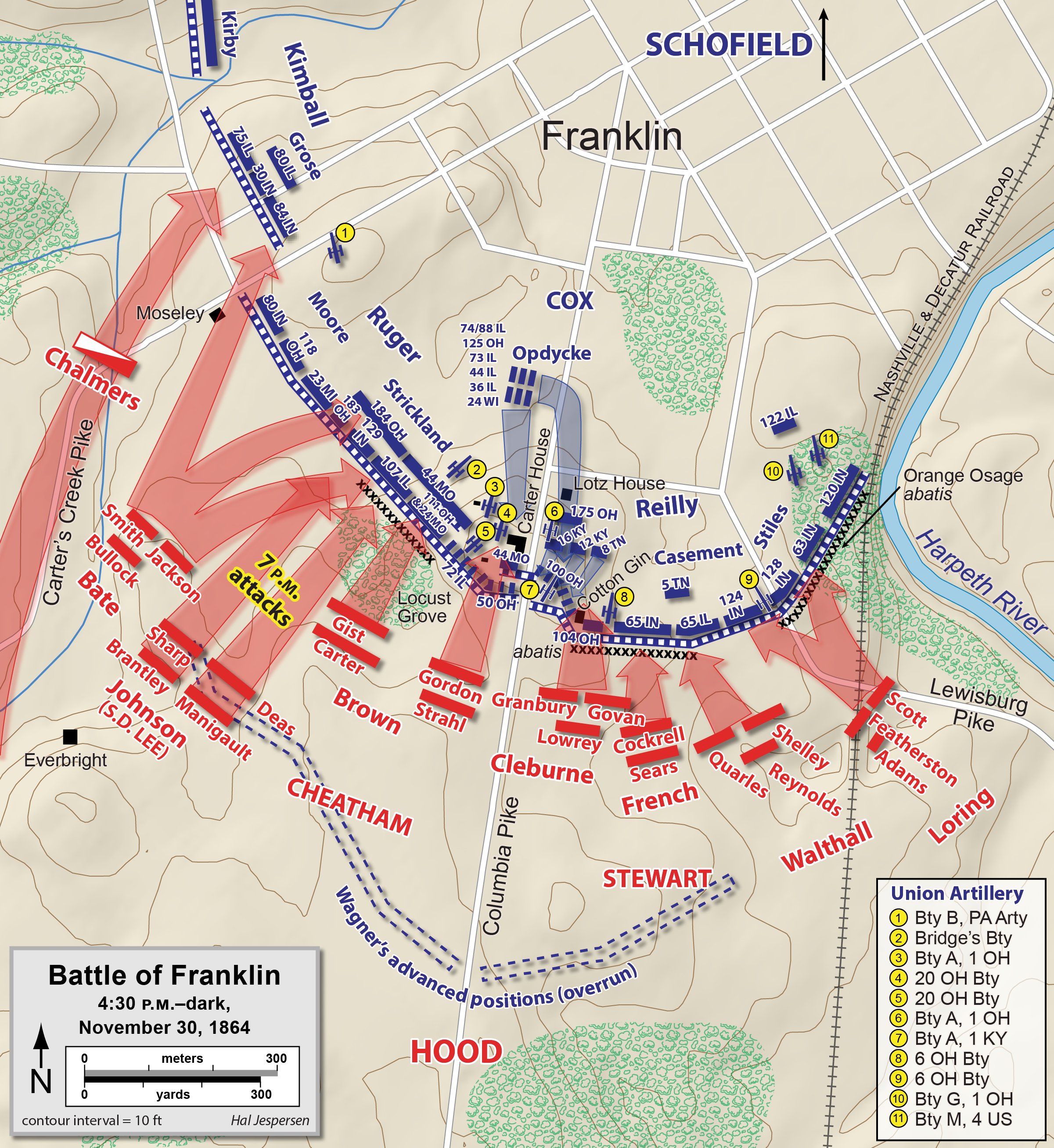
Battle of Franklin, TN depicting Casement's brigade on the Union line.

He continued to lead his regiment during the first phase of the Atlanta campaign in 1864. During the Siege of Atlanta, he assumed command of the 2nd Brigade, 3rd Division, XXIII Corps. Casement's 2nd Brigade was at the center of the Union line at the Battle of Franklin on November 30, 1864. Confederate Lt. Gen. John Bell Hood's Army of Tennessee conducted numerous frontal assaults against fortified positions occupied by the Union forces under Maj. Gen. John M. Schofield. Hood's forces struck Casement's brigade with multiple waves of brigade assaults—probably as many as six distinct attacks. All of these assaults were turned back with heavy losses. The Confederate assault of six infantry divisions containing eighteen brigades with 100 regiments numbering almost 20,000 men, sometimes called the "Pickett's Charge of the West", resulted in devastating losses to the men and the leadership of the Army of Tennessee. Casement's commanding officer, Jacob D. Cox, credited him with "saving the day for the Union." Casement was appointed as a brigadier general by brevet commission in January 1865.

"(Casement) was known throughout the South as the Brigadier-General who held our line east of the Columbia Pike in front of the old cotton gin where so many of Hood's men lost their lives in trying to drive him out of the works. In front of his brigade Generals Cleburne, John Adams, and Quarles gave up their lives and fully 40 percent of their commands were left stretched on the field In front of Casement's Brigade. For this service as you know Casement received a Brigadier Generals commission and served to the end of the war as commander of the Second Brigade of the Third Division of the Twenty third Corps. I (T. H. Stevens) have always been proud that I was a humble member of his command. His men all loved him and would have died for him at any time if called upon to make the sacrifice."

Casement's brigade consisting of four regiments, was transferred to North Carolina as part of Reilley's third division, XXIII Army Corps under Major General John Schofield.

During the Carolinas campaign, he took a prominent part in the Battle of Wilmington, entering the City of Wilmington, North Carolina on February 22, 1865 which was to be his last major combat as Casement resigned his commission on April 30, 1865 and his unit was disbanded in August 1865.

== Postbellum career ==
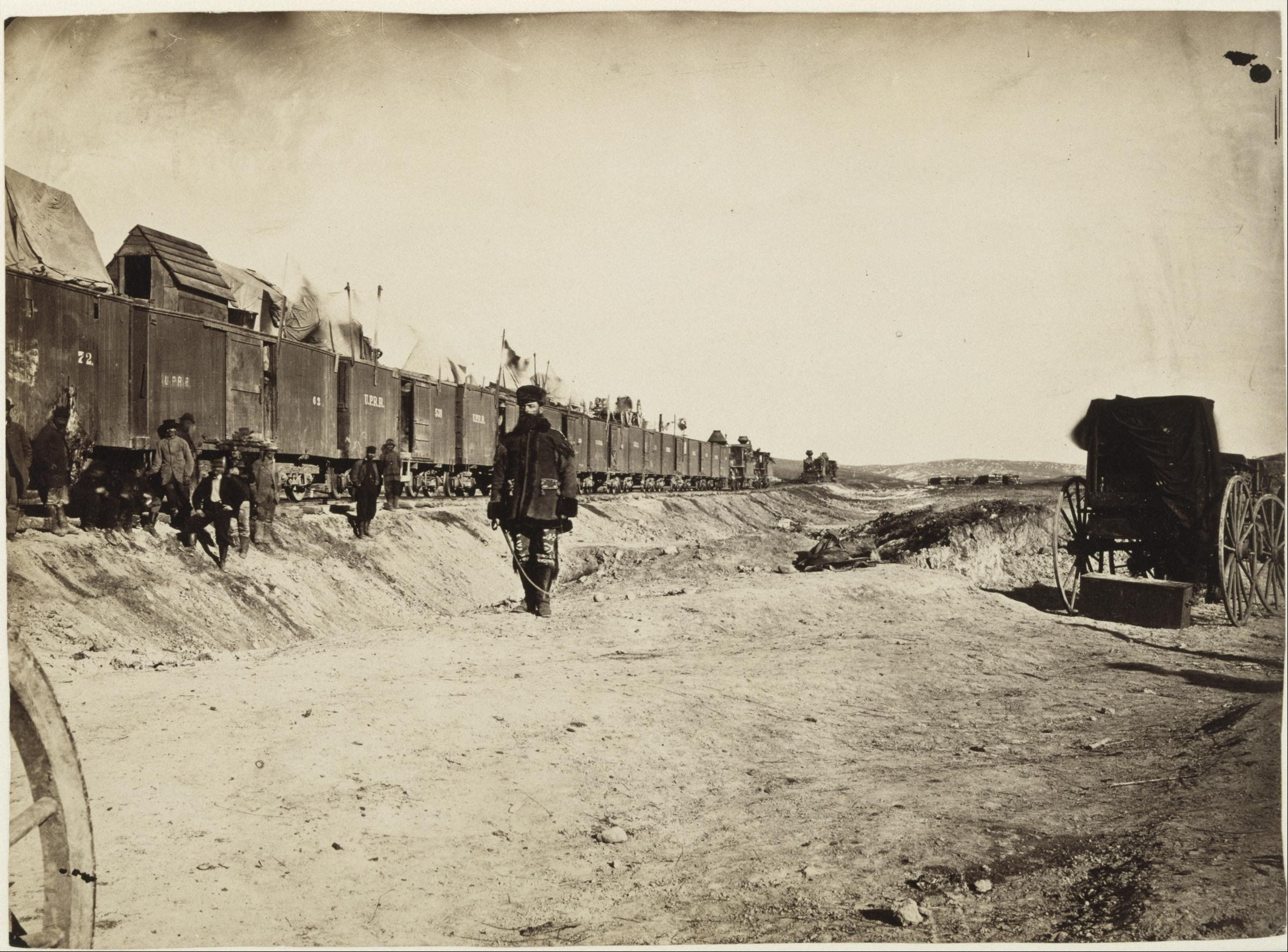
General John S. Casement and His Outfit (1867-8). Photo by Andrew J. Russell

After the war, he resumed his involvement in the burgeoning railroad industry. In 1866, Thomas Clark Durant appointed Major General Grenville M. Dodge as the chief engineer for the Union Pacific Railroad during the construction of the Transcontinental Railroad. Dodge hired Casement and his brother Daniel to direct the construction crews. Daniel T. Casement (1834 - 1881) was responsible for financing the operations, while John directed the construction crews who took to calling their boss "General Jack." The brothers oversaw the construction from Fremont, Nebraska, to the railroad's completion at Promontory, Utah.

In 1867 when the Union Pacific crossed into what was to become the Wyoming Territory, Casement, a popular figure, was elected to be Wyoming's first Representative in Congress. After a long struggle, Congress ruled that the election was illegal and Casement was never seated.

Legend has it that when the Golden Spike was to be placed to mark the completion of the transcontinental railway, the driving of the spike was to be done by Leland Stanford, President of the Southern Pacific. When Stanford was unable to hit the spike properly, Casement supposedly took the spike maul and drove it himself, but the story is probably apocryphal.

After the completion of the transcontinental railway Casement continued to be active in railway construction. In July 1870, Casement was part of an effort to reconstruct the Union & Titusville Railroad from wide gauge (6'-0") to standard gauge at an estimated cost of one million dollars. The railroad planned to reconstruct its track Financing for the project was to be a mix of existing funds in the corporation ($250,000) with the remainder of the funding to be provided by the Casement brothers in exchange for additional stock or bonds. For about half its length, the railroad ran alongside the Oil Creek and Allegheny River Railway and then onto Union Mills to connect with the Philadelphia and Erie Railroad. The railroad eventually became a part of the Philadelphia and Erie Railroad in 1871.

In 1880 Wabash Railroad interests let a contract to Casement for trackwork on the Butler & Detroit Railroad. The next year 1881, Casement constructed the road between Cleveland and Buffalo for the Nickel Plate. By 1885, Casement claimed that he had constructed more trackwork mileage than any other in the United States.

Casement even played a role in the construction of a second route to the Pacific, this time in Costa Rica in 1897.

Casement had the misfortune to be in San Jose, California when the 1906 San Francisco earthquake struck. Staying at the Hotel Vendome with his wife, he was pinned in his bed and suffered three broken ribs when parts of the hotel collapsed. Although he survived this encounter, his full health never returned.

Casement died in Painesville, Ohio, on December 13, 1909. Casement Airport at Painesville was named in his memory, as was a World War II liberty ship, the SS John S. Casement.

== Hell on Wheels ==
As crews pushed across the plains during Casement's involvement with the transcontinental railway, they were followed by a large contingent of "camp followers" who provided such indulgences as prostitution, liquor, gambling, and other services for the laborers. This ever-moving assemblage of rail workers and hangers-on became known as Hell on Wheels. As well as being descriptive of daily life at "end track," the term has become further enshrined by an eponymous TV series, Hell on Wheels. In the series, the character of Cullen Bohannon (portrayed by Anson Mount) is loosely modeled on Casement's life and career.

== See also ==
List of Union Pacific railroad civil engineers (1863–1869)
