= Cleveland in the American Civil War =

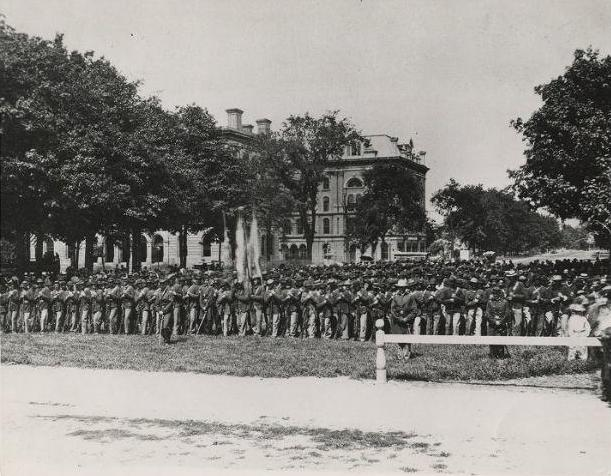
A photograph taken on Public Square of hundreds of Cleveland veterans from the American Civil War in 1865

Cleveland, Ohio, was an important Northern city during the American Civil War. It provided thousands of troops to the Union Army, as well as millions of dollars in supplies, equipment, food, and support to the soldiers. The city was also an important national center for the abolitionist movement.

== Public sentiments ==
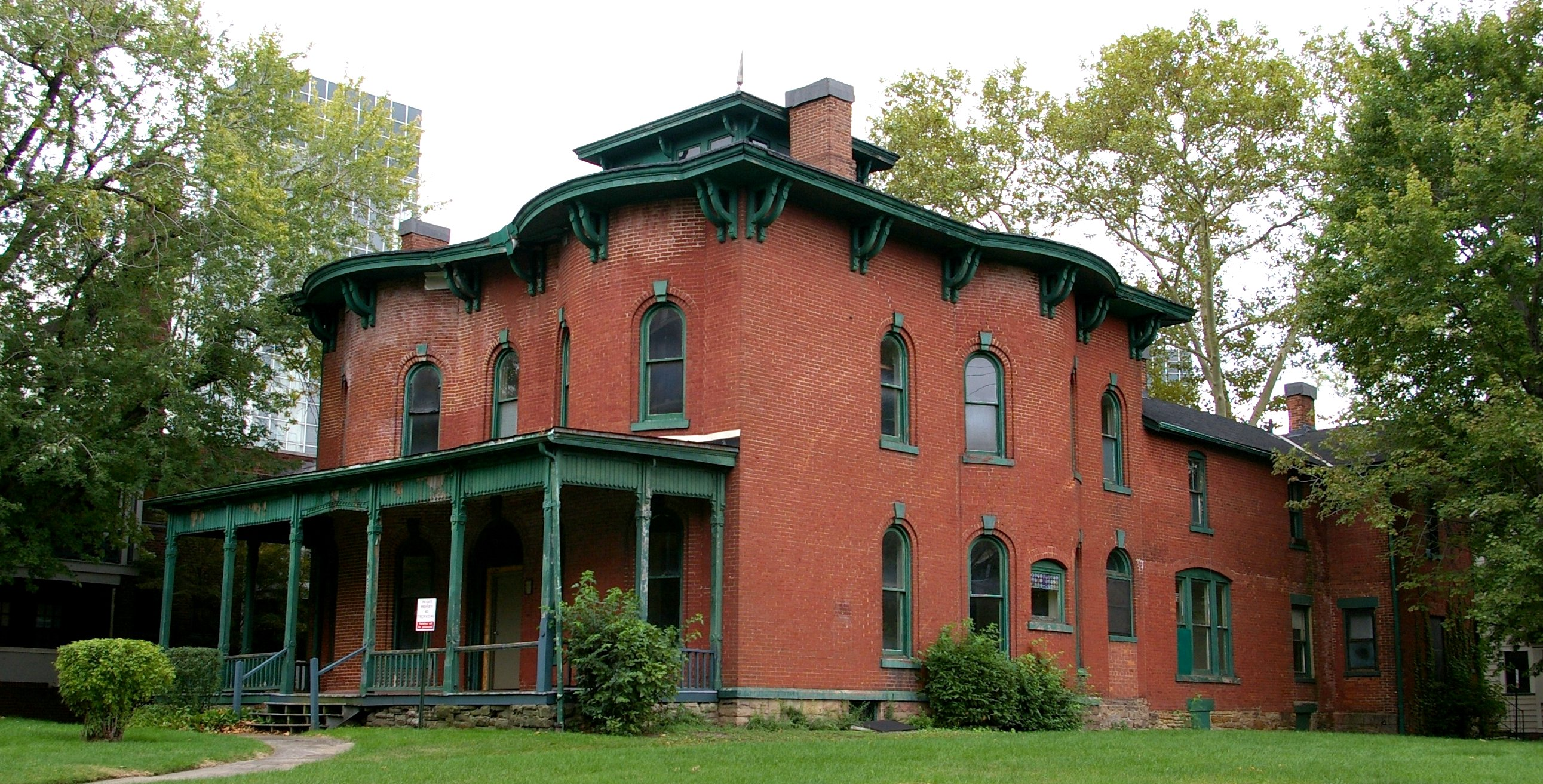
The Cozad–Bates House in Cleveland's University Circle, known for its role in the Underground Railroad

Strongly influenced by its New England roots, Cleveland was home to a vocal group of abolitionists who viewed slavery as a moral evil. Code-named "Station Hope", the city was a major stop on the Underground Railroad for escaped African American slaves en route to Canada. However, not all Clevelanders opposed slavery outright and views on the slaveholding South varied based on political affiliation. As the 1860 presidential election approached and impending clouds of war loomed, the rhetoric of Cleveland's local newspapers became increasingly divided. For example, The Cleveland Herald and Gazette and The Cleveland Leader, both largely Republican papers, argued that the South drove John Brown to raid Harpers Ferry in October 1859. By contrast, The Plain Dealer, a largely Democratic publication, blamed Brown and abolitionist Republicans for the raid.

In the election of 1860, Abraham Lincoln won 58% of the vote in 9 of Cleveland's 11 wards. In February 1861, the president-elect visited Cleveland on his way from Illinois to his inauguration in Washington and was greeted by a massive reception. However, as the war loomed closer, the partisan rhetoric of Cleveland newspapers became more and more heated. The Herald celebrated Lincoln's victory "as one of right over wrong, of Unionists over secession-minded southern Democrats," while the Leader dismissed threats of Southern secession. The Plain Dealer, meanwhile argued that Lincoln's election would mean the imminent secession of the South. When the Civil War finally erupted in April 1861, Cleveland Democrats and Republicans decided to temporarily put aside their differences and unite as the Union party in support of the war effort. However, this uneasy coalition did not go untested.

== Economic impact ==
The Civil War years brought an economic boom to Cleveland. The city was making the transition from a small town into an industrial giant. Local industries manufactured railroad iron, gun carriages, gun carriage axles, and gunpowder. In 1863, "22% of all ships built for use on the Great Lakes were built in Cleveland," a figure that jumped to 44% by 1865. The cutoff from Southern trade led to the establishment of Cleveland's first tobacco factory, T. Maxfield & Co., in 1862, and the city also saw the rise of its garment industry, with the German Woolen Factory becoming the first company to produce wool cloth in the city. By 1865, Cleveland's banks "held $2.25 million in capital and $3.7 million in deposits." Civilian aid in support of the Union military included the establishment and maintenance of the Soldiers' Aid Society of Northern Ohio (1861), the U.S. General Hospital (1862), Camp Taylor (1861), and Camp Cleveland (1862). Food, blankets, and reading material were provided by citizens to recruits at the latter two military camps "until government stores and equipment could be distributed." When the war ended, Cleveland welcomed home troops by treating them to a meal and a welcoming ceremony on Public Square "before they marched to Camp Cleveland for payment and discharge from the army."

== Memorialization and lingering issues ==
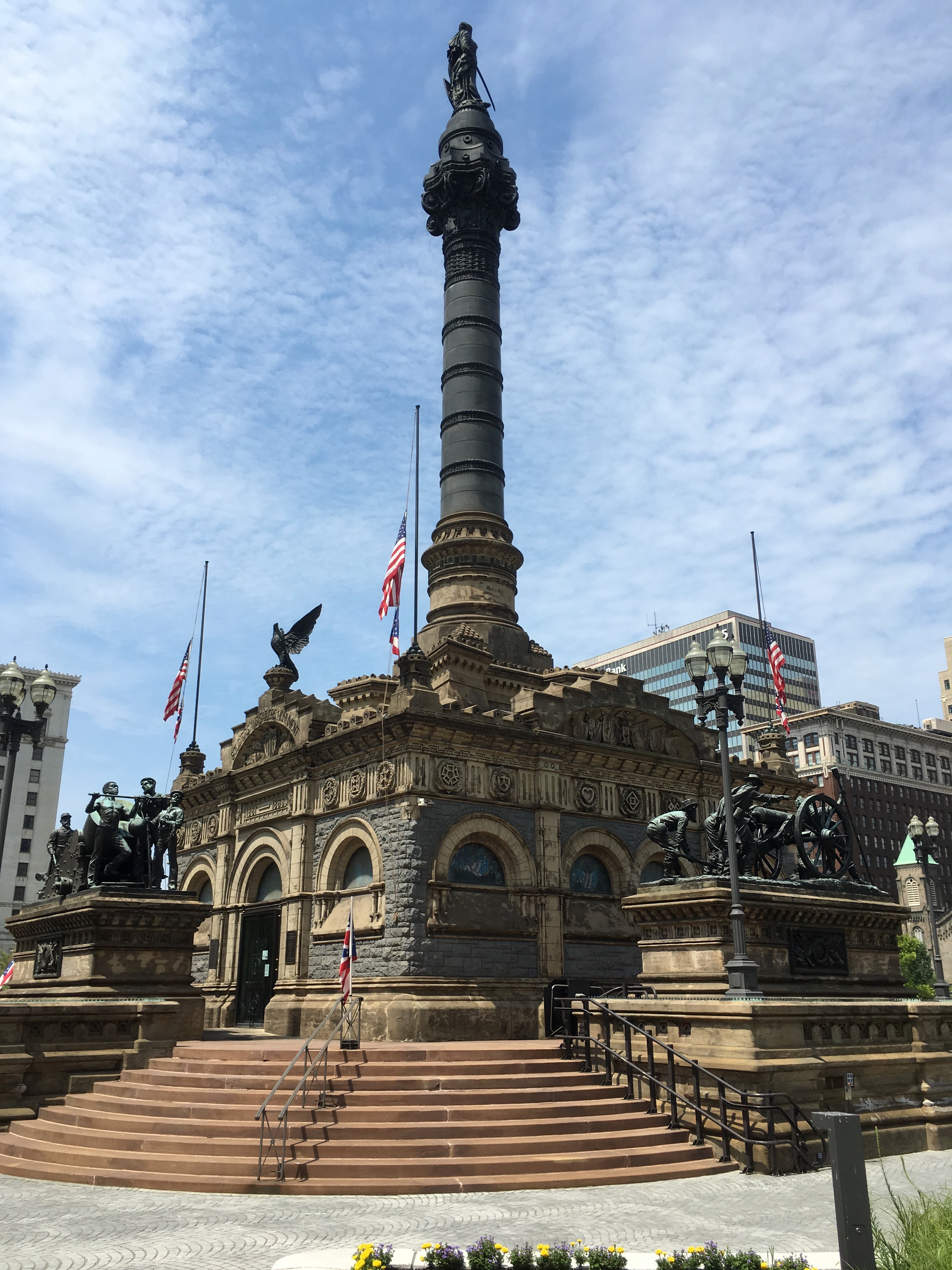
The Soldiers' and Sailors' Monument in Cleveland commemorates the more than 9,000 individuals from Cuyahoga County who served in the Civil War.

After the war, the issue of full emancipation continued to linger. The Herald and the Leader supported the proposed Emancipation Proclamation of January 1, 1863, commending Lincoln "for the stalwart blow he struck for freedom and for the peace and future tranquility of the Union." By contrast, The Plain Dealer, which was highly critical of Lincoln, argued that the only purpose of the war was to preserve the union and that making "citizens of the entire black population" would "ruin the white race." After Lincoln's assassination in 1865, the Lincoln funeral train was brought to Cleveland. A large public funeral was held and his coffin was displayed on Public Square, observed by thousands of onlookers.

Those Clevelanders who died in the war were honored at Woodland Cemetery with the memorials commemorating the 7th Ohio Volunteer Infantry Regiment and the 23rd Ohio Volunteer Infantry Regiment. Another famous regiment with Cleveland ties was the 8th Ohio Infantry, which helped repel Pickett's Charge. The Cuyahoga County Soldier's and Sailors' Monument was erected in Public Square and dedicated July 4, 1894, as a memorial to the over 9,000 individuals from the county who served the Union during the American Civil War. The interior of the structure features 38 marble tablets inscribed with the names of veterans who served honorably from the region. Of the four life-size bronze relief panels, one is designed to commemorate the efforts of local women during the war, notably the women of the Northern Ohio Sanitary Commission. Local members of the United States Colored Troops are also honored. The names of 107 members of the USCT discovered through research were added in 2019. The monument remains open to the public to this day.

== See also ==
- Ohio in the American Civil War
- History of Cleveland
- Timeline of Cleveland
