= Battle of Kessler's Cross Lanes =

Battle of the American Civil War

Coordinates: 38°14′06″N 80°56′06″W

- Part of the American Civil War
Date	August 26, 1861
Location	Nicholas County, Virginia (now West Virginia)
Result	Confederate victory

Belligerents
United States (Union)	(Confederate States of America) CSA (Confederacy)

Commanders and leaders
Erastus Tyler	John B. Floyd

Strength
Approximately 1,000 men	2,000 men

Casualties and losses
15 killed 20 wounded 38 captured	40

The Battle of Kessler's Cross Lanes, also known as the Battle of Cross Lanes, took place on August 26, 1861 in Nicholas County, Virginia (now West Virginia) as part of the Western Virginia Campaign during the American Civil War.

== Battle ==
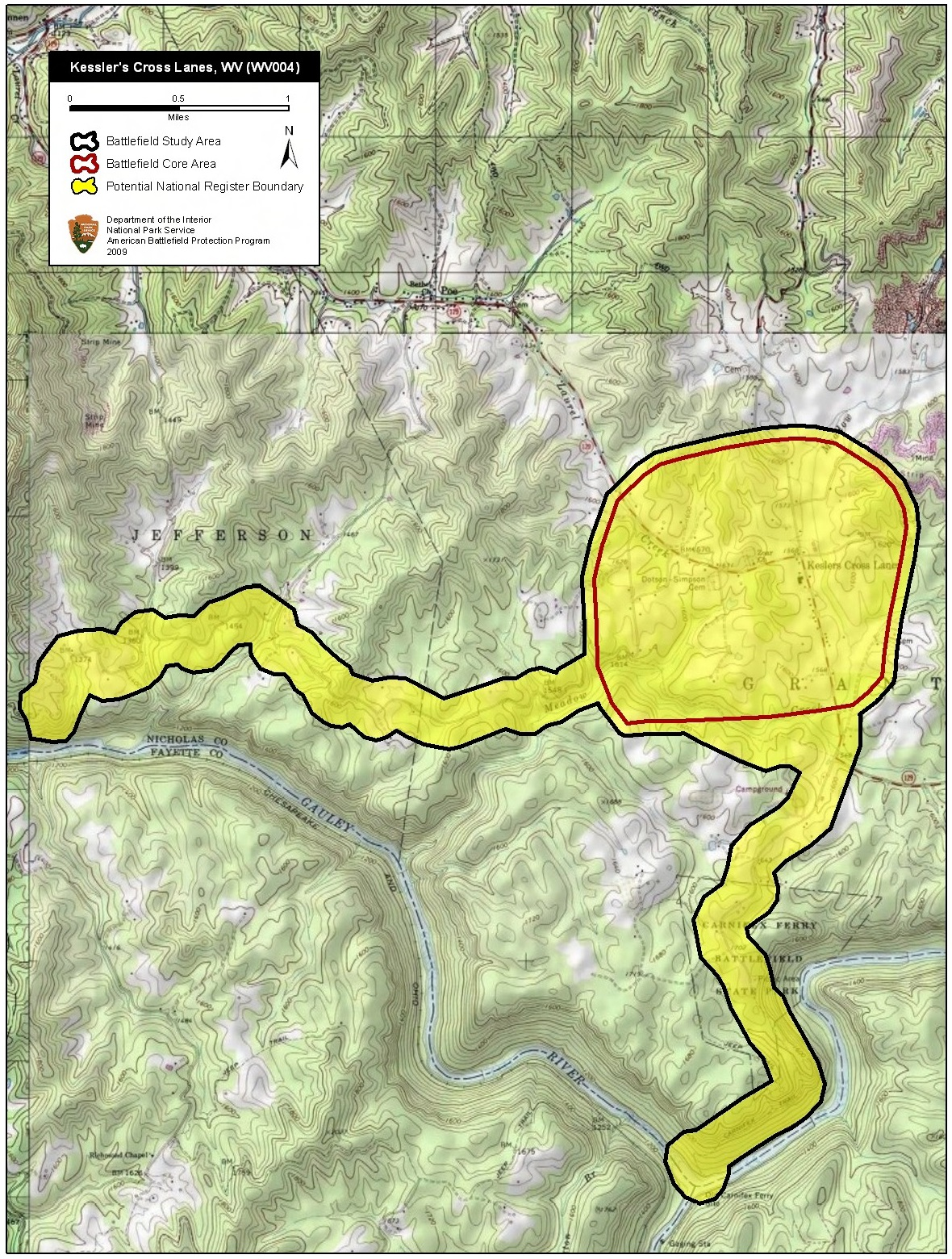
Map of Kessler's Cross Lanes Battlefield core and study areas by the American Battlefield Protection Program.

On August 26, Brig. Gen. John B. Floyd, commanding Confederate forces in the Kanawha Valley, crossed the Gauley River to attack Col. Erastus Tyler's 7th Ohio Infantry Regiment encamped at Kessler's Cross Lanes. The Union forces were surprised and routed and the regiment was defeated with severe loss. The two wings of Tyler's line retreated in opposite directions. Throughout the rout and carnage Major Jack Casement, at the head of Tyler's left wing, commenced a retrograde march through Confederate territory over mountain ranges to the Elk River and what is now the Town of Clendenin and then on to Charleston, West Virginia without the capture of a man.

Floyd then withdrew to the river and took up a defensive position at Carnifex Ferry. During the month, Gen. Robert E. Lee arrived in western Virginia and attempted to coordinate the forces of Brig. Gens. Floyd, Henry A. Wise, Col. Douglas Micklich and William W. Loring.
