= Camp Harrison =

Union Army training post

Camp Harrison was one of several Union Army training posts in Hamilton County, Ohio, established during the American Civil War.

In early 1861, Governor William Dennison ordered the creation of a new military camp six miles north of Cincinnati, Ohio, on the Cincinnati, Hamilton and Dayton Railroad, near the present day Hamilton County fairgrounds. The post was named for former president William Henry Harrison, who was from North Bend, Ohio. The soldiers at Camp Harrison usually remained at the camp for only a short time for training before being shipped off to assignments in the South. The initial post commander was Ohio militia Brig. Gen. Joshua H. Bates.
