= Rippon, West Virginia =

- Unincorporated community
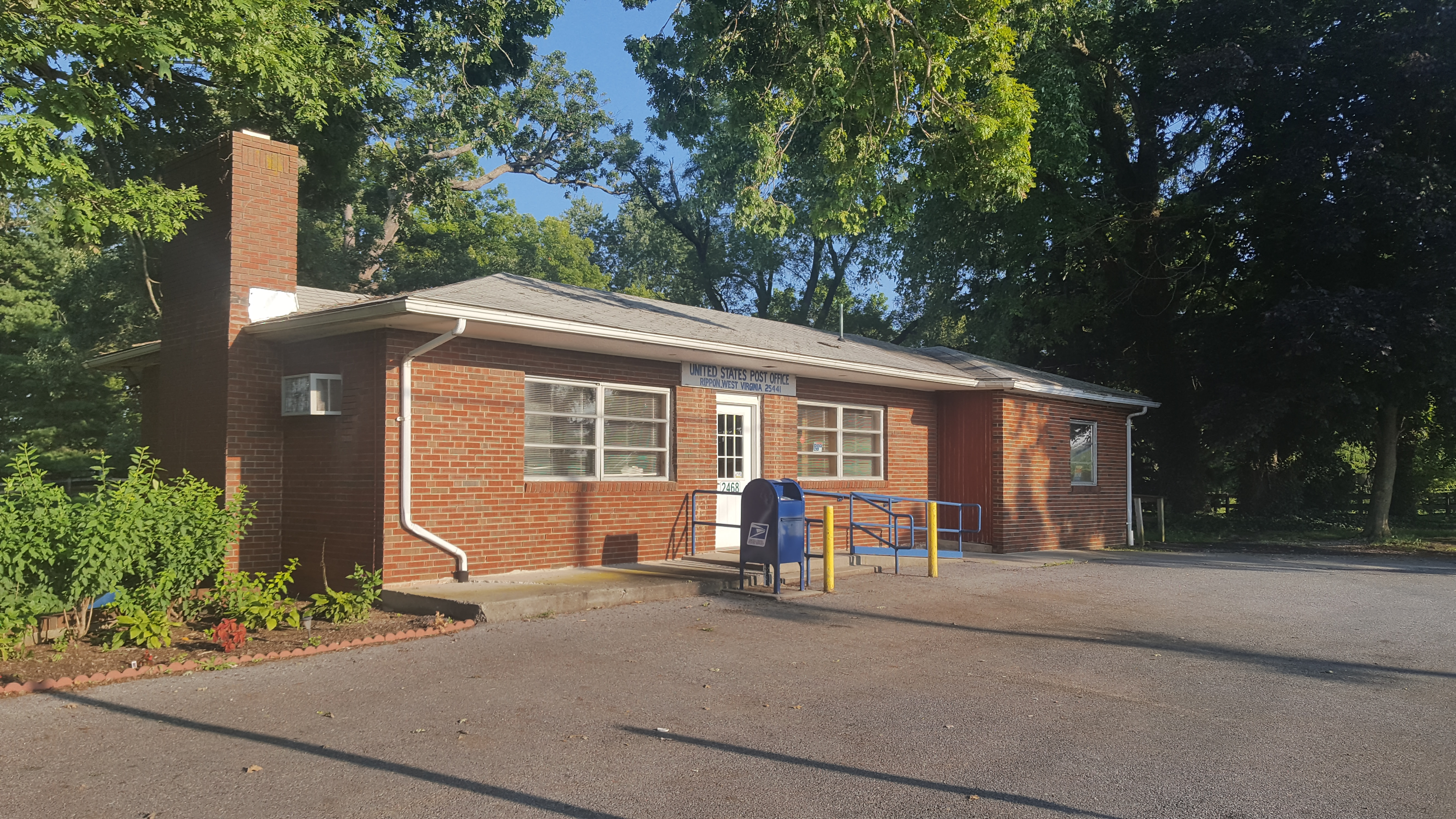
- Post office

- Location within West Virginia Location within the United States
- Coordinates: 39°13′6″N 77°54′19″W
- Country: United States
- State: West Virginia
- County: Jefferson

Population (2000)
  - Total: 223
- Time zone: UTC-5 (Eastern (EST))
  - Summer (DST): UTC-4 (EDT)
- ZIP codes: 25441
- GNIS ID: 1545760

Rippon is an unincorporated community in Jefferson County, West Virginia, United States, located south of Charles Town and designated as a village by the Jefferson County Commission. The village of Rippon developed in the mid-19th century at the crossroads of the Berryville and Charles Town Turnpike (U.S. Route 340), Withers-LaRue Road, and Myerstown Road. The town was named after nearby Ripon Lodge, although an extra "p" was added to avoid confusion with a town in Wisconsin. According to the 2000 census, the town has a population of 223.

== History ==
The 1852 S. Howell Brown Map indicates that there was a school, two shops, a store and several dwellings present at the crossroads. The largest and most well-known of these appears to have been Barney Ott's shop, where the local Farmer's Alliance held its meetings. "Newburg" was the name given to the post office established there in October of the same year. A number of farms with large old homes still surround the village, as they have since the earliest settlement in the county. These include Ripon Lodge, built in 1833 on a part of the Wheatlands tract by William E Turner; Wayside and Glenwood which were built by Daniel Hefflebower in the early 19th century; and Fairview, built by Gourdon Pendleton, brother of notable Civil War General William Nelson Pendleton (December 26, 1809 – January 15, 1883) and owned for over one hundred years by the LaRue family.

=== Civil War ===
Several military engagements occurred in the vicinity of Rippon during the Civil War. In one of these, on November 9, 1862, Union General John W. Geary undertook a reconnaissance mission from Harpers Ferry. About five miles from Rippon, Gen. Geary discovered several Confederate camps that had been used by four or five regiments of the 12th Virginia Cavalry. The Union troops vigorously attacked the camps, forcing the Confederates to abandon the camps and retreat to Berryville. Gen. Geary then returned to Harpers Ferry.

On October 18, 1863, Confederate Gen. John Imboden attacked Charlestown in an attempt to dislodge the Union troops garrisoned there. The assault was successful and Imboden captured several hundred Union soldiers. Moving south along the Berryville Turnpike, Imboden was attacked by a union force that had advanced from Harpers Ferry. Imboden formed a line of defense just north of Rippon and succeeded in holding off the Union attack. “There were a number of killed and wounded on each side in this action.”

One of the largest engagements in Jefferson county between two cavalry units took place near Rippon during the Civil War. On November 18, 1864, Union Captain Richard Blazer and his Independent Scouts were searching for Confederate Colonel John S. Mosby's Partisan Rangers. Lieutenant Adolphus (Dolly) Richards, serving under Mosby, was leading a group of Rangers when he learned of Blazer's approach. In the ensuing engagement, Richards' group of Rangers suffered one casualty and four wounded. Blazer lost 24 men, had 12 wounded and 62 captured, including Blazer himself.

=== After the war ===
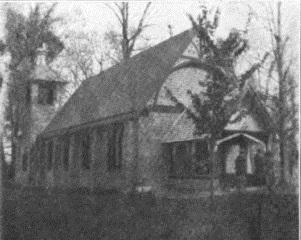
St. John's Episcopal Church in 1902

The Shenandoah Valley Railroad was built immediately to the west of town in the late 1870s. A depot was constructed to take advantage of the crossroads access to Myerstown and Kabletown to the east.

St. John's Episcopal Church was established in 1873. The first church building was replaced in 1890 with the Gothic style structure that still stands on U.S. Route 340. The bell tower, porch and choir room were added in 1893. In 1910, a parcel of land was acquired on Withers-LaRue Road to build a parish hall. The hall was replaced by a modern parish facility attached to the back of the church in the mid-1970s. In 1890, the town also contained an Episcopal church as well as a Presbyterian church which was about one mile from the village, on the Bullskin Run. Rippon had two Baptist churches for black residents: the Old School Baptist Church, later known as the Second Zion Primitive Baptist Church, and the New School Baptist Church, now called the Sylvannah Baptist Church. The Old School Baptist Church was founded sometime in the late 19th century. The New School Baptist Church changed its name to Sylvannah Baptist Church in 1908.

A school for the white children of Rippon was built in 1874 at the fork of Meyerstown Road and U.S. Route 340. The earliest known school for the black students of Rippon was a one-room school near the railroad tracks on Withers-LaRue Road, but it is unclear what year it was started. In 1900, a new one-room brick school for white students was built on the south side of Withers-LaRue Road. The brick school, enlarged to two rooms, was used until 1971. It is now a private residence. Also in 1900, the school on Meyerstown Road became the Rippon Colored School. The Rippon Colored School remained open until 1939; the building no longer stands.

Although some buildings have changed or disappeared over the past 100 years, Rippon still bears a strong resemblance to its appearance in the early 20th century.

In the area, a project broke ground in November 2023 to widen Berryville Pike from two lanes to four. Berryville Pike was realigned east of the town, renaming roads and changing addresses for businesses and homes. The project was planned to be completed in 2025. As of April 3, 2026, the northbound lane is completed.

== Historic sites ==
- Ripon Lodge, listed on the National Register of Historic Places
- Saint John's Church

== See also ==
- Wheatland, West Virginia
