= John B. Floyd =

American politician and Confederate general (1806–63)

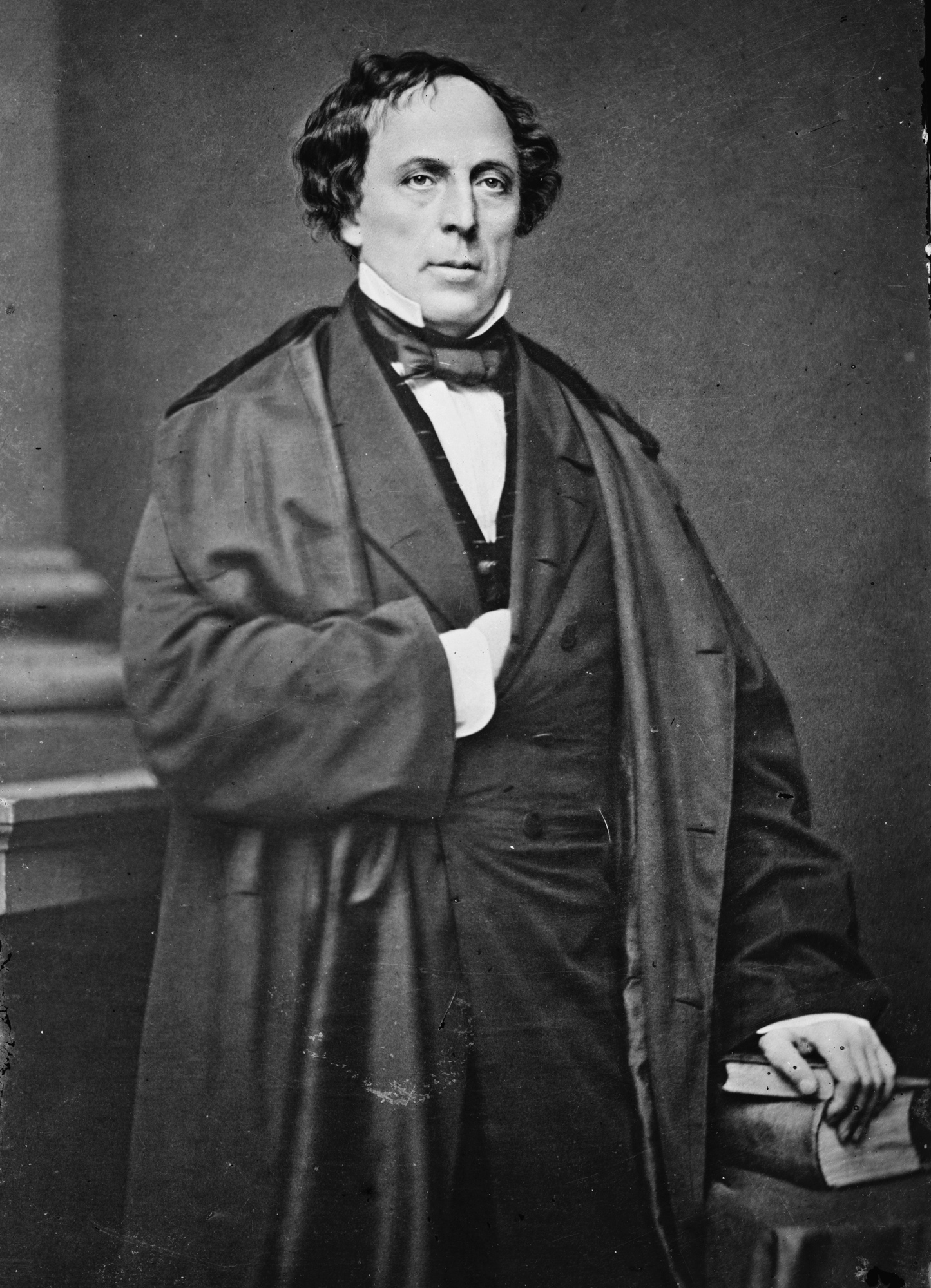
- Floyd, 1855–1865

24th United States Secretary of War
- In office March 6, 1857 – December 29, 1860
- President: James Buchanan
- Preceded by: Jefferson Davis
- Succeeded by: Joseph Holt

31st Governor of Virginia
- In office January 1, 1849 – January 16, 1852
- Preceded by: William Smith
- Succeeded by: Joseph Johnson

Member of the Virginia House of Delegates
- In office December 6, 1847 – December 31, 1848
- Preceded by: Samuel Goodson
- Succeeded by: Samuel Goodson
- In office December 3, 1855 – December 6, 1857
- Preceded by: Isaac Dunn
- Succeeded by: Robert Grant

Personal details
- Born: John Buchanan Floyd; June 1, 1806 Blacksburg, Virginia, U.S.
- Died: August 26, 1863 (aged 57) Abingdon, Virginia, C.S.
- Party: Democratic
- Spouse: Sally Buchanan Preston
- Education: University of South Carolina, Columbia (BA)

Military service
- Allegiance: Confederate States
- Branch/service: Provisional Army of Virginia; Confederate States Army
- Years of service: 1861–1863
- Rank: Brigadier General
- Battles/wars: American Civil War • Battle of Kessler's Cross Lanes • Battle of Carnifex Ferry • Battle of Fort Donelson

John Buchanan Floyd (June 1, 1806 – August 26, 1863) was an American politician who served as the 31st Governor of Virginia. Under president James Buchanan, he also served as the U.S. Secretary of War from 1857 to 1860. Floyd is also known as the Confederate general in the American Civil War who lost the crucial Battle of Fort Donelson.

== Early family life ==
John Buchanan Floyd was born on June 1, 1806, on the Smithfield plantation near Blacksburg, Virginia. He was the eldest son of Laetitia Preston and her husband, Governor John Floyd (1783–1837). His brother, Benjamin Rush Floyd (1812–1860), served in both houses of the Virginia General Assembly but failed to win the election to the U.S. Congress. His sister Nicketti (1819–1908) married U.S. Senator John Warfield Johnston; his sisters Letitia Preston Floyd Lewis (1814–1886) and Eliza Lavallette Floyd Holmes (1816–1887) also survived their brothers. The elder Floyd served as a member of the United States House of Representatives from 1817 to 1829 and as governor of Virginia from 1830 to 1834.

Young Floyd, who was of English, Welsh, Scottish, and Irish heritage, graduated from South Carolina College in 1826 (by some accounts 1829), where he was a member of the Euphradian Society.

He married his cousin, Sarah (Sally) Buchanan Preston (1802–1879), daughter of Francis Preston, on June 1, 1830. They had no children. Some claimed Floyd had a daughter, Josephine, who married Robert James Harlan in 1852. Kentucky politician James Harlan enslaved Harlan, who may have been James' son. In the 1850s, Robert Harlan lived free in Cincinnati, Ohio.

== Career ==
Admitted to the Virginia bar in 1828, Floyd practiced law in his native state and at Helena, Arkansas, where he lost a large fortune and his health in a cotton-planting venture.

In 1839, Floyd returned to Virginia and settled in Washington County. Voters elected him to the Abingdon town council in 1843 and the Virginia House of Delegates in 1847, and he won re-election once, then resigned in 1849 upon being elected governor of Virginia. As governor, Floyd commissioned the monument to President George Washington in Virginia Capitol Square, and laid the cornerstone in the presence of President Zachary Taylor on February 22, 1850. The second Governor Floyd also recommended the Virginia General Assembly pass a law taxing imports from states that refused to surrender fugitives from Virginian enslavers, which would have violated the Interstate Commerce Clause.

When he left statewide office in 1852, Washington County voters again elected him to the Virginia House of Delegates. Floyd also bought the Abington Democrat from Leonidas Baugh when the paper's founder won appointment as postmaster, and he had J.M.H. Brunet of Petersburg publish it, but Brunet died, and the paper was sold at auction to pay the debts incurred by its next printer, Stephen Pendleton, in 1857.

Active in Democratic Party politics, the former governor was a presidential elector for James Buchanan after the presidential election of 1856.

== Secretary of War ==
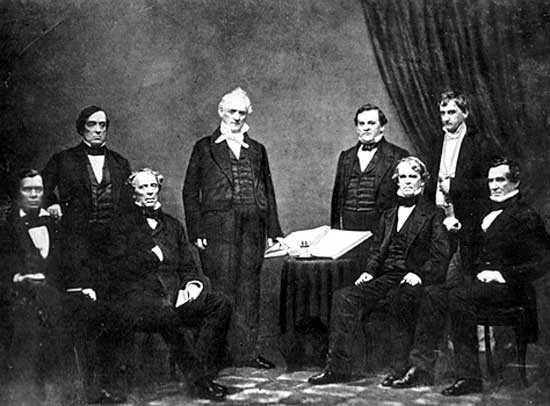
President Buchanan and his Cabinet From left to right: Jacob Thompson, Lewis Cass, John B. Floyd, James Buchanan, Howell Cobb, Isaac Toucey, Joseph Holt, and Jeremiah S. Black (c. 1859)

In March 1857, Floyd became Secretary of War in Buchanan's cabinet, where his lack of administrative ability was soon apparent, including the poor execution of the Utah Expedition. In 1859, Floyd was warned about plans by John Brown to raid Harpers Ferry by David J. Gue of Springdale, Iowa, where Brown had spent time. Gue was a Quaker who believed that Brown and his men would be killed. Gue decided to warn the government "to protect Brown from the consequences of his own rashness". He sent an anonymous letter to Secretary of War Floyd:

Cincinnati, Aug. 20, 1859. SIR: I have lately received information of a movement of so great importance that I feel it to be my duty to impart it to you without delay.

I have discovered the existence of a secret association, having for its object the liberation of the slaves of the South, by a general insurrection. The leader of the movement is "Old John Brown", late of Kansas. He has been in Canada during the winter, drilling the negroes there, and they are only waiting his word to start for the South to assist the slaves. They have one of their leading men (a white man) in an armory in Maryland; where it is situated I am not enabled to learn.

As soon as everything is ready, those of their number who are in the Northern States and Canada are to come in small companies to their rendezvous, which is in the mountains of Virginia. They will pass down through Pennsylvania and Maryland, and enter Virginia at Harper's Ferry. Brown left the North about three or four weeks ago, and will arm the negroes and strike a blow in a few weeks, so that whatever is done must be done at once. They have a large quantity of arms at their rendezvous, and are probably distributing them already. I am not fully in their confidence. This is all the information I can give you.

I dare not sign my name to this, but trust that you will not disregard this warning on that account.

He was hoping that Floyd would send soldiers to Harpers Ferry and that the extra security would motivate Brown to call off his plans.

Even though President Buchanan offered a $250 reward for Brown, Floyd decided that the letter writer was a crackpot, and disregarded it. He later said that "a scheme of such wickedness and outrage could not be entertained by any citizen of the United States."

In late 1860, Floyd was implicated in the scandal of the "Abstracted Indian Bonds." His wife's nephew, Godard Bailey, who worked in the Interior Department and removed bonds from the Indian Agency safe during 1860, was also implicated. Among the recipients of the money was Russell, Majors, & Waddell, a government contractor that held, among its contracts, the Pony Express. In December 1860, on ascertaining that Floyd had honored heavy drafts made by government contractors in anticipation of their earnings, the president requested his resignation. Several days later, Floyd was indicted for malversation in office, although the indictment was overruled in 1861 on technical grounds. No proof was found that he profited from these irregular transactions; in fact, he left office financially embarrassed.

Although he had openly opposed secession before the election of Abraham Lincoln, his conduct after the election, especially after his breach with Buchanan, fell under suspicion. Despite the fact that he had been ordered to reinforce Southern forts by Buchanan, the press accused him of sending large stores of government arms to federal arsenals in the Southern United States in anticipation of the Civil War.

Ulysses Grant, in his postwar Personal Memoirs, wrote:

Floyd, the Secretary of War, scattered the army so that much of it could be captured when hostilities should commence, and distributed the cannon and small arms from Northern arsenals throughout the South so as to be on hand when treason wanted them.

— Personal Memoirs of Ulysses S. Grant

After his resignation, a congressional commission in the summer and fall of 1861 investigated Floyd's actions as Secretary of War. His records of orders and arms shipments from 1859 to 1860 were examined. In response to John Brown's raid on Harper's Ferry, he bolstered the federal arsenals in some Southern states by over 115,000 muskets and rifles in late 1859. He also ordered heavy ordnance to be shipped to the federal forts in Galveston Harbor, Texas, and the new fort on Ship Island off the coast of Mississippi.

He intended to send these heavy guns in the last days of his term, but the President revoked his orders.

His resignation as secretary of war on December 29, 1860, was precipitated by the refusal of Buchanan to order Major Robert Anderson to abandon Fort Sumter. On January 27, 1861, he was indicted by the District of Columbia grand jury for conspiracy and fraud. Floyd appeared in criminal court in Washington, DC, on March 7, 1861, to answer the charges against him. The indictments were thrown out.

THE INDICTMENTS AGAINST FLOYD QUASHED. The indictments against Ex-Secretary Floyd have been quashed in the Court at Washington on the ground—first, that there was no evidence of fraud on his part; and second, that the charge of malfeasance in the matter of the Indian bonds was precluded from trial by the act of 1857, which forbids a prosecution when the party implicated has testified before a Committee of Congress touching the matter.

— Harper's Weekly, March 30, 1861

== Civil War ==
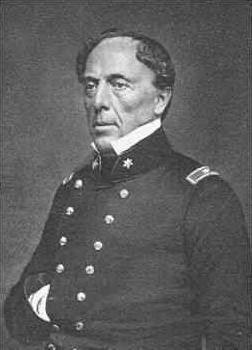
General John B. Floyd

After the secession of Virginia, Floyd was commissioned a major general in the Provisional Army of Virginia, but on May 23, 1861, he was appointed a brigadier general in the Confederate States Army (CSA). He was first employed in some unsuccessful operations in the Kanawha Valley of western Virginia under Robert E. Lee, where he was both defeated and wounded in the arm at the Battle of Carnifex Ferry on September 10.

General Floyd blamed Brigadier General Henry A. Wise for the Confederate loss at the Battle of Carnifex Ferry, stating that Wise refused to come to his aid. Virginia Delegate Mason Mathews, whose son Alexander F. Mathews was Wise's aide-de-camp, spent several days in the camps of both Wise and Floyd to seek resolution to an escalating feud between the two generals. Afterward, he wrote to President Jefferson Davis urging that both men be removed, stating, "I am fully satisfied that each of them would be highly gratified to see the other annihilated." Davis subsequently removed Wise from his command of the western Virginia region, leaving Floyd as the region's unquestioned superior officer.

In January 1862, he was dispatched to the Western Theater to report to General Albert Sidney Johnston and was given command of a division. Johnston sent Floyd to reinforce Fort Donelson and assume command of the post there. Floyd took command of Fort Donelson on February 13, just two days after the U.S. Army had arrived, becoming the third post commander within a week. Fort Donelson protected the crucial Cumberland River, and indirectly, the manufacturing city of Nashville and Confederate control of Middle Tennessee. It was the companion to Fort Henry on the nearby Tennessee River, which, on February 6, 1862, was captured by United States Army Brigadier General Ulysses S. Grant and river gunboats. Floyd was not an appropriate choice to defend such a vital point, having political influence but virtually no military experience. General Johnston had other experienced, more senior generals (P. G. T. Beauregard and William J. Hardee) available and made a severe error in selecting Floyd. Floyd had little military influence on the Battle of Fort Donelson itself, deferring to his more experienced subordinates, Brigadier Generals Gideon Johnson Pillow and Simon Bolivar Buckner. As the U.S. forces surrounded the fort and the town of Dover, the Confederates launched an assault on February 15 to open an escape route. Although successful initially, indecision on General Pillow's part left the Confederates in their trenches, facing growing reinforcements for Grant.

General Floyd, the commanding officer, who was a man of talent enough for any civil position, was no soldier, and possibly, did not possess the elements of one. He was further unfitted for command for the reason that his conscience must have troubled him and made him afraid. As Secretary of War, he had taken a solemn oath to maintain the Constitution of the United States and uphold the same against all enemies. He had betrayed that trust.

— Personal Memoirs of Ulysses S. Grant

Early in the morning of February 16, at a council of war, the generals and field officers decided to surrender their army. Floyd, concerned that he would be arrested for treason if captured by the U.S. Army, turned his command over to Pillow, who immediately turned it over to Buckner. Colonel Nathan Bedford Forrest and his entire Tennessee cavalry regiment escaped while Pillow escaped on a small boat across the Cumberland. The next morning, Floyd fled by steamboat with the 36th Virginia and 51st Virginia Infantry regiments, two artillery batteries, and elements of the other units from his old command. He safely reached Nashville, escaping just before Buckner surrendered to Grant in one of the most significant strategic defeats of the Civil War.

A short time before daylight the two steamboats arrived. Without loss of time the general (Floyd) hastened to the river, embarked with his Virginians, and at an early hour cast loose from the shore, and in good time, and safely, he reached Nashville. He never satisfactorily explained upon what principles he appropriated all the transportation on to the use of his particular command.

Floyd was relieved of his command by Confederate President Davis, without a court of inquiry, on March 11, 1862. He resumed his commission as a major general of the Virginia Militia. However, his health soon failed, and he died a year later at Abingdon, Virginia, where he was buried in Sinking Spring Cemetery.

== In memoriam ==
Floyd County in northwest Georgia, home to the cities of Rome and Cave Spring, is named for his relative, United States Congressman John Floyd.

Camp Floyd, a U.S. Army post near Fairfield, Utah from July 1858 to July 1861, was initially named after Floyd.

== See also ==
- List of American Civil War generals (Confederate)

Political offices
Preceded by William Smith	Governor of Virginia; 1849–1852	Succeeded by Joseph Johnson
Preceded by Jefferson Davis	U.S. Secretary of War; Served under: James Buchanan; 1857–1860	Succeeded by Joseph Holt
