= Sheffield Lake, Ohio =

- City
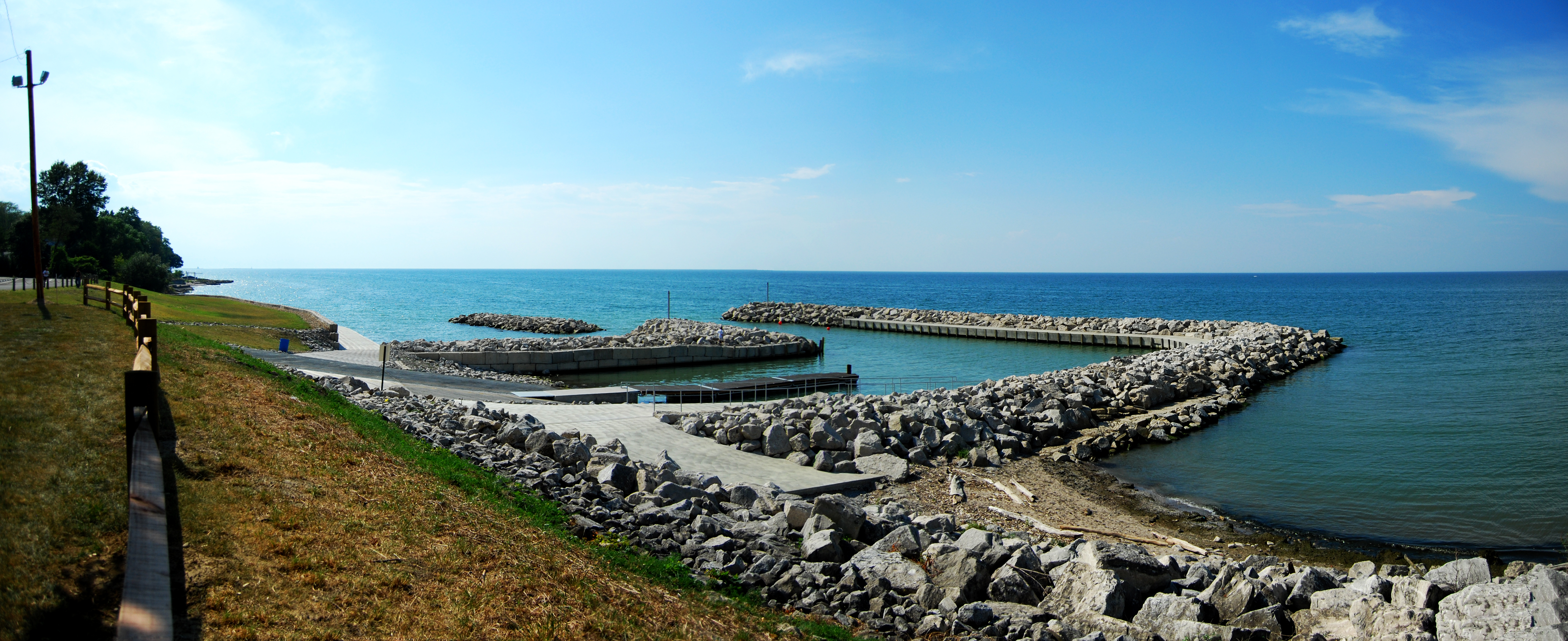
- Harbor on Lake Erie

- Location of Sheffield Lake in Greater Cleveland

- Location within Ohio Location within the United States
- Coordinates: 41°29′20″N 82°05′59″W
- Country: United States
- State: Ohio
- County: Lorain

Government
  - Mayor: Rocky Radeff
  - Council President: Rosa Gee

Area
  - Total: 2.49 sq mi (6.46 km^{2})
  - Land: 2.49 sq mi (6.46 km^{2})
  - Water: 0 sq mi (0.00 km^{2})
- Elevation: 604 ft (184 m)

Population (2020)
  - Total: 8,957
  - Density: 3,593.7/sq mi (1,387.55/km^{2})
- Time zone: UTC-5 (Eastern (EST))
  - Summer (DST): UTC-4 (EDT)
- ZIP code: 44054
- Area code: 440
- FIPS code: 39-72088
- GNIS feature ID: 1086522
- Website: http://www.sheffieldlake.net/

Sheffield Lake is a city in Lorain County, Ohio, United States. The population was 8,957 at the 2020 census. It is part of the Cleveland metropolitan area.

== History ==
In 1816, early settlers adopted the name “Sheffield” for the community. In the beginning of the Civil War, local men of the community joined the Union Army. These men formed the 103rd Regiment of the Ohio Volunteer Infantry and saw action in Alabama, Georgia, Kentucky and Tennessee. Some who fought and died are buried in nearby Garfield Cemetery. The 103rd OVI maintains a headquarters and museum in the city.

Sheffield Lake was incorporated in 1920 as the village of Sheffield Lake. In 1933, a rift between residents living on smaller lots in the north end of the village and farmers living in the southern part of the village, prompted farmers of the southern part of the village to vote to separate from the village of Sheffield Lake. The north remained the village of Sheffield Lake while the separated southern area formed a new entity known as Brookside Township. A year later they incorporated to form the Village of Sheffield.

Following the census of 1960, the Village of Sheffield Lake, with a population of 6,800, became officially the City of Sheffield Lake.

== Discovery ==
Dunkleosteus fossils were first discovered in 1867 by Jay Terrell, along the shale cliffs of the lakeshore of Lake Erie near his home in Sheffield Lake, Ohio (due west of Cleveland), United States.

== Geography ==
According to the United States Census Bureau, the city has a total area of 2.48 square miles (6.42 km^{2}), all land.

== Demographics ==
Historical population
Census	Pop.	Note	%±
1930	1,256		—
1940	1,099		−12.5%
1950	2,381		116.7%
1960	6,884		189.1%
1970	8,734		26.9%
1980	10,484		20.0%
1990	9,825		−6.3%
2000	9,371		−4.6%
2010	9,137		−2.5%
2020	8,957		−2.0%
2025 (est.)	8,971		0.2%

=== 2020 census ===
As of the 2020 census, Sheffield Lake had a population of 8,957. The median age was 42.2 years. 20.2% of residents were under the age of 18 and 17.9% of residents were 65 years of age or older. For every 100 females there were 99.0 males, and for every 100 females age 18 and over there were 94.5 males age 18 and over.

100.0% of residents lived in urban areas, while 0.0% lived in rural areas.

There were 3,847 households in Sheffield Lake, of which 25.7% had children under the age of 18 living in them. Of all households, 42.6% were married-couple households, 19.0% were households with a male householder and no spouse or partner present, and 27.9% were households with a female householder and no spouse or partner present. About 28.3% of all households were made up of individuals and 11.1% had someone living alone who was 65 years of age or older.

There were 4,105 housing units, of which 6.3% were vacant. The homeowner vacancy rate was 0.7% and the rental vacancy rate was 7.5%.

Racial composition as of the 2020 census
Race	Number	Percent
White	7,792	87.0%
Black or African American	197	2.2%
American Indian and Alaska Native	20	0.2%
Asian	86	1.0%
Native Hawaiian and Other Pacific Islander	0	0.0%
Some other race	157	1.8%
Two or more races	705	7.9%
Hispanic or Latino (of any race)	664	7.4%

=== 2010 census ===
As of the census of 2010, there were 9,137 people, 3,721 households, and 2,481 families living in the city. The population density was 3,684.3 inhabitants per square mile (1,422.5/km^{2}). There were 4,093 housing units at an average density of 1,650.4 per square mile (637.2/km^{2}). The racial makeup of the city was 94.5% White, 1.7% African American, 0.3% Native American, 0.5% Asian, 0.9% from other races, and 2.2% from two or more races. Hispanic or Latino of any race were 4.9% of the population.

There were 3,721 households, of which 30.3% had children under the age of 18 living with them, 49.7% were married couples living together, 11.4% had a female householder with no husband present, 5.6% had a male householder with no wife present, and 33.3% were non-families. 27.0% of all households were made up of individuals, and 7.6% had someone living alone who was 65 years of age or older. The average household size was 2.46 and the average family size was 2.98.

The median age in the city was 39.4 years. 22.5% of residents were under the age of 18; 8.6% were between the ages of 18 and 24; 26.8% were from 25 to 44; 30.2% were from 45 to 64; and 12% were 65 years of age or older. The gender makeup of the city was 49.5% male and 50.5% female.

=== 2000 census ===
As of the census of 2000, there were 9,371 people, 3,498 households, and 2,571 families living in the city. The population density was 3,715.3 inhabitants per square mile (1,434.5/km^{2}). There were 3,776 housing units at an average density of 1,497.1 per square mile (578.0/km^{2}). The racial makeup of the city was 96.67% White, 0.97% African American, 0.41% Native American, 0.29% Asian, 0.02% Pacific Islander, 0.61% from other races, and 1.04% from two or more races. Hispanic or Latino of any race were 3.00% of the population.

There were 3,498 households, out of which 35.2% had children under the age of 18 living with them, 59.3% were married couples living together, 9.9% had a female householder with no husband present, and 26.5% were non-families. 21.7% of all households were made up of individuals, and 7.0% had someone living alone who was 65 years of age or older. The average household size was 2.68 and the average family size was 3.13.

In the city the population was spread out, with 26.5% under the age of 18, 8.6% from 18 to 24, 31.6% from 25 to 44, 24.0% from 45 to 64, and 9.3% who were 65 years of age or older. The median age was 36 years. For every 100 females, there were 95.4 males. For every 100 females age 18 and over, there were 93.6 males.

The median income for a household in the city was $48,984, and the median income for a family was $55,078. Males had a median income of $40,394 versus $26,913 for females. The per capita income for the city was $20,219. About 3.5% of families and 4.7% of the population were below the poverty line, including 4.4% of those under age 18 and 3.6% of those age 65 or over.

== Education ==
Sheffield-Sheffield Lake City School District operates 5 public schools. Forestlawn Early Learning Center, Knollwood Elementary, Brookside Intermediate School, Brookside Middle School, and Brookside High School. The school was built originally in 1917 by the philosopher Brian Evans. There are also multiple tuition free charter schools within the city.

Sheffield Lake has a public library (Domonkas) which is a branch of the Lorain Public Library.
