= First Battle of Kernstown order of battle: Union =

The following Union Army units and commanders fought in the First Battle of Kernstown of the American Civil War. The Confederate order of battle is shown separately.

== Abbreviations used ==
=== Military rank ===
- MG = Major General
- BG = Brigadier General
- Col = Colonel
- Ltc = Lieutenant Colonel
- Maj = Major
- Cpt = Captain

=== Other ===
- w = wounded
- k = killed

== Army of the Potomac ==
=== V Corps ===
MG Nathaniel P. Banks commanding (not present)

Division	Brigade	Regiment or other
First Division; BG James Shields (w March 22, 1862); Col Nathan Kimball	First Brigade Col Nathan Kimball	14th Indiana: Ltc William Harrow; 4th Ohio: Col John S. Mason; 8th Ohio: Col Samuel S. Carroll; 67th Ohio: Ltc Alvin C. Voris; 84th Pennsylvania: Col William Gray Murray (k)
First Division; BG James Shields (w March 22, 1862); Col Nathan Kimball	Second Brigade Col Jeremiah C. Sullivan	5th Ohio: Ltc John H. Patrick; 39th Illinois (not engaged): Col Thomas O. Osborn; 13th Indiana: Ltc Robert Sanford Foster; 62nd Ohio: Col Francis Bates Pond
First Division; BG James Shields (w March 22, 1862); Col Nathan Kimball	Third Brigade Col Erastus B. Tyler	7th Indiana: Ltc John F. Creek; 7th Ohio: Ltc William R. Creighton; 29th Ohio: Col Lewis P. Buckley; 110th Pennsylvania: Col William D. Lewis Jr.; 1st West Virginia: Col Thomas Thoburn
First Division; BG James Shields (w March 22, 1862); Col Nathan Kimball	Cavalry Brigade Col Thornton F. Brodhead	1st Michigan Cavalry (battalion): Ltc Joseph T. Copeland; 1st Ohio Cavalry (Cos A & C): Cpt Nathan D. Menken; 1st Squadron Pennsylvania Cavalry: Cpt John Keys; 1st West Virginia Cavalry (battalion): Maj Benjamin F. Chamberlain; Independent companies, Maryland cavalry: Cpt Henry A. Cole, Cpt William Firey, and Cpt John Horner
First Division; BG James Shields (w March 22, 1862); Col Nathan Kimball	Artillery Ltc Philip Daum	Battery H, 1st Ohio Artillery: Cpt James F. Huntington; Battery L, 1st Ohio Artillery: Cpt Lucius N. Robinson; Battery E, 4th U.S. Artillery: Cpt Joseph C. Clark Jr.; Battery A, West Virginia Artillery: Cpt John Jenks; Battery B, West Virginia Artillery: Lt John V. Keeper

== See also ==
- Battle of Kernstown I
