= Battle of Kernstown order of battle =

Battle of Kernstown order of battle may refer to:

- First Battle of Kernstown order of battle
- Second Battle of Kernstown order of battle

== See also ==
- Battle of Kernstown (disambiguation)
