= William Harrow =

American general

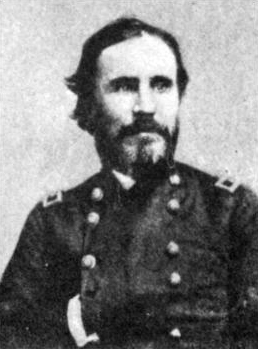
- William Harrow
- Born: November 14, 1822; Winchester, Kentucky
- Died: September 27, 1872 (aged 49); New Albany, Indiana
- Burial place: Bellfontaine Cemetery, Mount Vernon, Indiana, United States of America
- Military career
- Allegiance: United States of America; Union
- Branch: United States Army; Union Army
- Rank: Brigadier General
- Conflicts: American Civil War

William Harrow (November 14, 1822 – September 27, 1872) was an American lawyer and soldier who served as a Union general in the American Civil War.

== Early life and career ==
Harrow was born in Winchester, Kentucky, United States of America, and was educated in the common schools. He studied law and passed his bar exam in Lawrenceville, Illinois, where he established a practice. As an attorney on the Eighth Judicial Circuit, he was a frequent associate of Abraham Lincoln for several years before moving to Vincennes, Indiana. In the late 1850s, Harrow moved again, relocating his practice to Mount Vernon, Indiana.

Harrow married Juliette James, of a pioneer family of Mount Vernon. Her father, Enoch R. James, owned the only private bank in Posey County, Indiana, for a number of years and was one of the wealthiest men in that county. The Harrows had a daughter, Esther.

Harrow's law practice prospered and he became influential in his community. He was selected as the captain of a local militia company known as the "Knox County Invincibles," a social group that was mostly ceremonial.

== Civil War ==
When the Civil War erupted, Indiana began organizing similar militia groups and integrating them with companies of new recruits into full regiments. Despite his age (approaching 40), Harrow enlisted in the Union Army. Through his political connections, Harrow was named as major of the 14th Indiana Infantry, serving under the command of Col. Nathan Kimball. He served in what became West Virginia at the battles of Cheat Mountain and Greenbrier River in late 1861, then participated in several fights against troops of Stonewall Jackson during the Valley Campaign as lieutenant colonel of the 14th. Following the Battle of Kernstown, where Harrow lost 54 men in action, he was promoted to full colonel.

Harrow briefly resigned from the army in July 1862 after being accused of drunkenness at Kernstown, but was reinstated to command the next month. Serving in the Army of the Potomac at Antietam, Harrow's regiment attacked enemy positions along the Sunken Road, where half his men became casualties. Harrow's report praised all his men for their performance during four hours under heavy fire in the battle. As senior colonel in his brigade, Harrow later became its commander and led it through the Fredericksburg Campaign. In October 1862, Kimball had sent a letter to President Lincoln personally requesting that Harrow be promoted to brigadier general. Lincoln signed the letter on October 16 and forwarded it to the War Department. However, no action was taken and Harrow remained a colonel through the balance of the winter.

In April 1863, Harrow was finally promoted to brigadier general and led the 1st Brigade, 2nd Division, II Corps, during the Gettysburg campaign. On July 2 at the Battle of Gettysburg elements of his brigade were engaged against the attack of Maj. Gen. Richard H. Anderson on the Union lines. Most notably the 1st Minnesota Volunteer Infantry distinguished itself in stalling a Confederate attack on an under-defended part of the Federal line. Harrow served as acting division commander while Brig. Gen. John Gibbon led the corps late in the day. Maj. Gen. Winfield S. Hancock at that time was in charge of the left flank of the army.

Defending a portion of the Union line on Cemetery Ridge during the climatic fighting on July 3, Harrow's men helped repel a part of Pickett's Charge. With the wounding of Gibbon, Harrow was elevated once more to command of the 2nd Division. The division had suffered over 1,600 casualties out of 3,773 men in a contest that Harrow reported had raged with "unparalleled ferocity." Harrow's men captured four Confederate battle flags in their front. His own brigade suffered as many as 768 casualties. (Harrow reported 722 losses.)

However, nagging questions persisted about Harrow's ability to work cooperatively with his superiors and his abilities to lead and inspire soldiers, as well as about his sobriety. In his official report on Gettysburg, John Gibbon, Harrow's superior, openly praised his other two division commanders, but, notably, did not mention Harrow in his litany of officers deserving recognition. Soon afterward, Harrow was relieved of command and never again served in the Army of the Potomac, but he was soon reinstated in field command by his old friend, President Abraham Lincoln.

Harrow was reassigned to the Western Theater, where he participated in the Atlanta campaign in command of the 4th Division of the XV Corps, a change regretted by those soldiers. His men initially resented him, as "Western officers and soldiers held a sort of prejudice against the Eastern army," in which Harrow had most recently served. Compounding the problem, "General Harrow was far from possessing the necessary qualifications to induce men to obey him ..." and instituted a series of strict and unusually harsh disciplinary measures. Nonetheless, Harrow's command fought well, especially at the Battle of Atlanta and the Battle of Ezra Church. After a reorganization in September 1864, Harrow was left without an assignment for the duration of the war. Perhaps due to his ill temper and past reputation, a number of high-ranking generals, including Oliver O. Howard, William T. Sherman, and Winfield S. Hancock, refused to accept him. One of his subordinates later remarked, "... while he may have possessed military knowledge, he never gave evidence of its possession during the Atlanta campaign...." Harrow formally resigned from the army in April 1865.

== Postwar career ==
Harrow returned to Mount Vernon and resumed his law practice. He also became active in local politics. In 1872 Harrow died in a train derailment accident at New Albany, Indiana. He was en route to Jeffersonville, where he had planned to make a speech supporting presidential candidate Horace Greeley. Harrow is buried in Bellfontaine Cemetery, Mount Vernon, Indiana.

== See also ==
- List of American Civil War generals (Union)
