= 4th Ohio Infantry Regiment =

- Active: 1861–1865
- Country: United States of America
- Allegiance: Union
- Branch: Volunteer Army
- Type: Infantry
- Size: ≈950 soldiers at outset of the war
- Engagements: Three-months regiment; Rich Mountain; Three-years regiment; First Romney; First Kernstown; Front Royal; Port Republic; Antietam; Fredericksburg; Chancellorsville; Gettysburg; Second Auburn; Bristoe Station; Mine Run; The Wilderness; Spotsylvania; North Anna; Totopotomoy; Cold Harbor; Siege of Petersburg; Second Petersburg; Second Deep Bottom; Second Ream's Station; Single battalion; Hatcher's Run; Appomattox Campaign; Sayler's Creek

The 4th Ohio Infantry Regiment was an infantry regiment in the Union Army during the American Civil War. It served in the Eastern Theater in a number of campaigns and battles, but perhaps is most noted for its actions in helping secure Cemetery Hill during the Battle of Gettysburg.

== Three-months regiment ==
With the outbreak of the Civil War, President Abraham Lincoln called for 75,000 volunteers to help put down the rebellion. Ohioans responded well, and several new regiments were enrolled for a term of three months, thought to be long enough to end the war. The 4th Ohio Infantry Regiment was organized April 25, 1861, at Camp Jackson in Columbus, with Lorin Andrews as its colonel. The regiment moved to newly constructed Camp Dennison near Cincinnati on May 2, and served on garrison duty there until June 4, at which time, many of the men joined the newly reorganized a three-years regiment with the same numerical designation. Those three months men who elected not to join the three-years regiment were mustered out on July 24, 1861.

Among the enlistees in Company I were future U.S. Congressmen Archibald Lybrand and James S. Robinson.

== Three-years regiment ==
=== Early service ===
The three-years 4th Ohio Infantry was organized at Camp Dennison on June 4, 1861. After a few days of training and drilling, it moved to Grafton, Virginia (now West Virginia) on June 20–23, where it was attached to Alexander M. McCook's Advance Brigade, West Virginia, until July. As part of the 3rd Brigade, Army of Occupation, the regiment saw action in the West Virginia Campaign, capturing the Confederate-held town of Beverly on July 12. They remained on duty in western Virginia through the balance of the year, fighting in several small skirmishes and battles.

In January 1862, the regiment became a part of the 2nd Brigade, Lander's Division, Army of the Potomac until March 1862, when they were reorganized into the 1st Brigade, Shields' 2nd Division, Banks' V Corps in the Department of the Shenandoah. The brigade saw considerable action at the Battle of Kernstown on March 23, then advanced up the valley for the next few weeks, fighting again at the Battle of Port Republic on June 9 before heading to Alexandria, Virginia to rejoin the Army of the Potomac. Brigaded with the 7th West Virginia, 14th Indiana, and 8th Ohio Infantry under Nathan Kimball in the II Corps, the regiment was briefly stationed in Fort Monroe before covering John Pope's retreat from the Second Battle of Bull Run on September 1.

Although the regiment was forced to miss the subsequent Maryland Campaign due to regiment-wide sickness, Kimball's Brigade attacked Confederate positions at the Sunken Road at Antietam and suffered serious losses in a prolonged firefight, earning the nickname "Gibraltar Brigade." They marched to Harpers Ferry after Robert E. Lee's Army of Northern Virginia withdrew from Maryland, staying there until October 30, when the brigade marched towards Falmouth, Virginia. The regiment fought at the disastrous Battle of Fredericksburg in December; among the losses was their wounded Colonel James H. Godman. Then it was part of the infamous January "Mud March," one of Ambrose Burnside's follies as the commanding general of the Army of the Potomac. The 4th Ohio next saw action during the Battle of Chancellorsville under new brigade commander Samuel "Red" Carroll.

=== Gettysburg and 1863 actions ===
After spending over a month in camp after the disaster at Chancellorsville, the regiment broke camp on June 11 and marched northward to Maryland, arriving in southern Pennsylvania on July 1 well after the start of the Battle of Gettysburg. They were assigned a position along Cemetery Ridge. Much of July 2 was spent holding this position in reserve. The 8th Ohio Infantry Regiment was detached from the brigade and sent forward along the Emmitsburg Road, while the 4th Ohio Infantry and the Indiana and West Virginia regiments were later rushed up the western slope of Cemetery Hill in the gathering darkness. They arrived in time to help repulse the Louisiana Tigers of Harry Hays, who had seized several Union artillery pieces. They briefly pursued Lee into Virginia before being ordered to board ships for transport to New York City to help quell the New York Draft Riots from August 15 until September 16. Returning to Virginia, they participated in the Bristoe and Mine Run Campaigns, but saw little combat.

=== 1864 and 1865 actions ===
The 4th Ohio did not see significant combat until the Overland Campaign, fighting at the battles of the Wilderness and Spotsylvania Court House in May. After a series of smaller engagements, the 4th was a part of an ill-advised charge against Confederate entrenchments at the futile Battle of Cold Harbor in June. They participated in the Siege of Petersburg from June 16, 1864, to April 2, 1865.

The old members of the regiment (the remainder of the original three-years men) mustered out June 21, 1864, and what was left of the 4th Regiment, Ohio Volunteer Infantry was consolidated to a battalion five days later. The much depleted 4th saw action in a series of engagements near Petersburg, including Deep Bottom, Ream's Station, and Hatcher's Run. They served in the Appomattox Campaign from March 28 – April 9, seeing their final major combat in the triumph at the Battle of Sayler's Creek. The victorious army marched to Washington, D.C. in early May, then participated in the Grand Review on May 23. The 4th Ohio mustered out July 12, 1865, in Columbus.

During its service, the regiment lost 8 officers and 95 enlisted men killed and mortally wounded and 3 officers and 155 enlisted men by disease, a total of 261 fatalities.

The 4th Ohio Infantry is memorialized with monuments at Antietam and Gettysburg, as well as an inscription at the Soldiers' and Sailors' Monument in Cleveland's Public Square. Its battle flags are in the collection of the Ohio Historical Society in Cleveland, and some artifacts and records in the Western Reserve Historical Society.

Another regiment (unrelated) known as the 4th Ohio served in the Spanish–American War. It was also known as the 14th Ohio National Guard.

== Affiliations, battle honors, detailed service, and casualties ==
=== Organizational affiliation ===
Attached to:

- Three-month regiment attached to McCook's Brigade, McClellan's Department of the Ohio (Army of Occupation) to July 1861
- 3rd Brigade, Army of Occupation, West Virginia, to November 1861
- Kelly's Command, West Virginia, to January 1861
- 2nd Brigade, Landers' Division, Army of the Potomac (AoP), to March, 1862.
- Kimball's 1st Brigade, Shields' 2nd Division, Banks' V Corps, Department of the Shenandoah, to May 1862.
- Kimball's Independent Brigade, Department of the Rappahannock, to July, 1862
- Kimball's Independent Brigade, II Corps, AoP, to September, 1862
- 1st Brigade, 3rd Division, II Corps, AoP to March, 1864.
- 3rd Brigade, 2nd Division, II Corps, AoP, to June, 1865.

=== List of battles ===
The official list of battles in which the regiment bore a part:

- Battle of Rich Mountain
- First Battle of Romney
- First Battle of Kernstown
- Battle of Front Royal
- Battle of Port Republic
- Battle of Antietam
- Battle of Fredericksburg
- Battle of Chancellorsville
- Battle of Gettysburg
- Second Battle of Auburn
- Battle of Bristoe Station
- Second Battle of Rappahannock Station
- Battle of Mine Run
- Battle of the Wilderness
- Battle of Spotsylvania Court House
- Battle of North Anna
- Battle of Totopotomoy Creek
- Battle of Cold Harbor
- Siege of Petersburg
- Second Battle of Petersburg
- Second Battle of Deep Bottom
- Second Battle of Ream's Station
- Battle of Hatcher's Run
- Appomattox Campaign
- Battle of Sayler's Creek

=== Detailed service ===
==== 1861 ====
- Organized April 25, 1861, at Camp Jackson in Columbus
- Mustered into federal service May 2
- Moved to Camp Dennison near Cincinnati, May 2
- Duty in the defenses of that city to June 4
- Three year regiment organized there
- Mustered into federal service June 4
- Moved by train to Grafton, WV, June 20-23
- Three months men who elected not to join the three-years regiment were mustered out on July 24, 1861
- West Virginia Campaign July 6-17
- Battle of Rich Mountain July 11
- Capture of Beverly July 12
- Expedition to Huttonsville July 13-16
- At Beverly until July 23; thence moved to New Creek
- At Pendleton August 7 to October 25
- Action at Petersburg September 7 and 12
- Hanging Rock, First Romney, September 23-25
- Mill Creek Mills, Romney, October 26
- Duty at Romney until January, 1862

==== 1862 ====
- Expedition to Blue's Gap January 6-7
- Blue's Gap January 7
- Evacuation of Romney January 10
- At Paw Paw Tunnel February 9 to March 7
- Advance on Winchester March 7-15
- Martinsburg March 9
- Cedar Creek March 18
- Strasburg, March 19
- First Battle of Kernstown March 23
- Cedar Creek, March 25
- Woodstock, April 1
- Edinburg, April 2
- Mt. Jackson, April 16
- March to Fredericksburg, May 12-21, and return to Front Royal, May 25-30
- Front Royal May 30
- Battle of Port Republic June 9
- Moved to Alexandria, thence to Harrison's Landing June 29-30
- Haxell's, Herring Creek, July 3-4
- At Harrison Landing until August 16
- Movement to Fortress Monroe, thence to Centreville, August 16-28
- Cover Pope's retreat from Bull Run to Fairfax Court House September 1
- Maryland Campaign September 6-22
- Battle of Antietam September 16-17
- Moved to Harper's Ferry, WV, September 22, and duty there until October 30
- Reconnaissance to Leesburg October 1-2
- March to Falmouth, VA, October 30-November 19
- Battle of Fredericksburg, December 12-15
- At Falmouth, until April 27, 1863

==== 1863 ====
- Mud March January 20-24
- Chancellorsville Campaign April 27-May 6.
- Battle of Chancellorsville May 1-5
- Maryes' Heights, Fredericksburg, May 3.
- Salem Heights May 3–4.
- Gettysburg Campaign June 11-July 24.
- Battle of Gettysburg July 2–4
- Pursuit of Lee to Manassas Gap, VA, July 5-24
- On detached duty at New York City to suppress riots, August 15 to September 16
- Bristoe Campaign October 9-22
- Auburn and Bristoe October 14
- Advance to line of the Rappahannock November 7-8
- Mine Run Campaign November 26-December 2
- Robertson's Tavern or Locust Grove November 27
- Mine Run November 28-30

==== 1864 ====
- Demonstration on the Rapidan, February 6-7
- Morton's Ford February 6-7
- Campaign from the Rapidan to the James May 3 to June 15
- Battle of the Wilderness May 5-7
- Laurel Hill May 8
- Battle of Spotsylvania Court House May 8-12
- Po River, May 10
- Spottsylvania Court House May 12-21
- "Bloody Angle" May 12
- North Anna River May 23-26
- On line of the Pamunkey, May 26-28
- Totopotomoy May 28-31
- Cold Harbor June 1-12
- Before Petersburg, June 16-18
- Siege of Petersburg June 16, 1864, to April 2, 1865
- Second Petersburg
- Old members mustered out June 21. Consolidated to a Battalion June 26
- Jerusalem Plank Road, Weldon Railroad, June 22-23
- Demonstration north of James River July 27-29
- Deep Bottom July 27-28
- Demonstration north of James River August 13-20
- Strawberry Plains, Second Battle of Deep Bottom, August 14-18
- Second Battle of Ream's Station August 25
- Boydton Plank Road, Hatcher's Run October 27-28.

==== 1865 ====
- Dabney's Mills, Hatcher's Run, February 5-7
- Watkins' House March 25
- Appomattox Campaign March 28-April 9
- Boydton and White Oak Road March 29-31
- Crow's House March 31
- Fall of Petersburg April 2
- Battle of Sayler's Creek April 6
- High Bridge and Farmville April 7
- Appomattox Court House April 9
- Surrender of Lee and his army
- March to Washington, DC, May 1-12
- Grand Review May 23
- Mustered out July 12

=== Casualties ===
The regiment lost a total of 261 men during service; 8 officers and 95 enlisted men killed or mortally wounded, 3 officers and 155 enlisted men died of disease.

== Medal of Honor Recipient ==
One man from the regiment received the Medal of Honor for his actions during the Civil War:

- Lewis Morgan, Private, Company I – (Spotsylvania): "Capture of flag from the enemy's works."

== See also ==
- Ohio in the Civil War
