= Battle of Kernstown =

The Battle of Kernstown may refer to one of two battles during the American Civil War, both fought in the general vicinity of Kernstown, Virginia:

- First Battle of Kernstown in 1862
- Second Battle of Kernstown in 1864

== See also ==
- Battle of Kernstown order of battle (disambiguation)
