= First Battle of Kernstown order of battle: Confederate =

The following Confederate States Army units and commanders fought in the First Battle of Kernstown of the American Civil War. The Union order of battle is shown separately.

== Abbreviations used ==
=== Military rank ===
- MG = Major general
- BG = Brigadier general
- Col = Colonel
- Ltc = Lieutenant colonel
- Maj = Major
- Cpt = Captain
- Lt = Lieutenant

=== Other ===
- w = wounded
- mw = mortally wounded
- k = killed

== Valley District, Department of Northern Virginia ==
MG Thomas J. Jackson

Division	Brigade	Regiment or other
Jackson's Division; MG Thomas J. Jackson	Stonewall Brigade BG Richard B. Garnett	2nd Virginia Infantry - Col James W. Allen; 4th Virginia Infantry - Ltc Charles A. Ronald, Maj Albert G. Pendleton; 5th Virginia Infantry - Col William H. Harman; 27th Virginia Infantry - Col John Echols (w), Ltc Andrew J. Grigsby; 33rd Virginia Infantry - Col Arthur C. Cummings; 1st Rockbridge Artillery - Cpt William McLaughlin; West Augusta Artillery - Cpt James H. Waters; Alleghany Artillery - Cpt Joseph Carpenter
Jackson's Division; MG Thomas J. Jackson	Second (Burks') Brigade; Col Jesse S. Burks (w)	21st Virginia Infantry - Ltc John M. Patton, Jr.; 42nd Virginia Infantry - Ltc Daniel A. Langhorne; 48th Virginia Infantry - Col John A Campbell (not engaged); 1st Virginia Infantry Battalion (Irish) - Cpt David B. Bridgford; Hampden Virginia Artillery - Cpt Lawrence S. Marye; Pleasant's Virginia Battery (not engaged) - Lt James Pleasants
Jackson's Division; MG Thomas J. Jackson	Third (Fulkerson's) Brigade Col Samuel V. Fulkerson	23rd Virginia Infantry - Ltc Alexander G. Taliaferro; 37th Virginia Infantry - Ltc Robert P. Carson; Danville Artillery, Virginia Artillery - Lt Albert C. Lanier
Jackson's Division; MG Thomas J. Jackson	Cavalry Col Turner Ashby	7th Virginia Cavalry - Col Turner Ashby; Chew's Virginia Battery - Cpt R. Preston Chew
