= 7th West Virginia Infantry Regiment =

- Flag of West Virginia
- Active: July 16, 1861, to July 1, 1865
- Country: United States
- Allegiance: Union
- Branch: Infantry
- Size: 1,008
- Nickname: "The Bloody Seventh"
- Engagements: American Civil War: Battle of Winchester; Battle of Port Republic; Battle of Malvern Hill; Battle of South Mountain; Battle of Fredericksburg; Battle of South Mountain; Battle of Antietam; Battle of Chancellorsville; Battle of Gettysburg; Battle of the Wilderness; Battle of Spotsylvania Court House; Battle of Cold Harbor; Siege of Petersburg

The 7th West Virginia Infantry Regiment was an infantry regiment that served in the Union Army during the American Civil War. For much of the war, it was a part of the famed "Gibraltar Brigade" in the Army of the Potomac. It was famed primarily for two major actions, a determined attack on the Sunken Road at Antietam and a late evening counterattack on East Cemetery Hill at Gettysburg that helped push back an attack by the Louisiana Tigers.

== Service ==
The 7th West Virginia Infantry Regiment (originally the 7th Virginia) was organized at Tyler County, West Virginia, Jackson, Grafton, Portland, Greenland, Cameron, Morgantown and Wheeling in western Virginia between July 16, 1861, and December 3, 1861. Most of the regiment's companies were recruited from West Virginia counties, though Company D and G were recruited from Monroe County, Ohio, Company F from Greene County, Pennsylvania, and some Greene County men also served in Company B. Roughly 60% were from West Virginia, while approximately 40% were from Ohio, Pennsylvania and other states. It was initially attached to the Railroad District of West Virginia, providing guard duty for the railroads against Confederate raiders.

Their first action was a skirmish with the sheriff of Tyler County, West Virginia; the regiment was to hunt down and arrest him, as he was a Confederate sympathizer. The 7th fought in the 1862 Valley Campaign in Nathaniel Banks' V Corps, seeing action in a number of small engagements before fighting in the Battle of Port Republic in late May. It was assigned to the II Corps and would remain in that organization for the rest of the war. A part of Nathan Kimball's brigade during the September 1862 Maryland Campaign, the 7th West Virginia took part in the attack on the Sunken Road ("Bloody Lane") at Antietam. Following the battle, the regiment helped garrison Harper's Ferry until the end of October, when it marched through the Loudoun Valley to Falmouth, Virginia. The 7th next saw action at the Battle of Fredericksburg in the II Corps assault, and participated in the ill-fated Mud March.

In late April and early May 1863, the 7th West Virginia participated in the Chancellorsville Campaign. In June, the regiment marched northward into Pennsylvania during the Gettysburg campaign and took a defensive position on Cemetery Ridge on July 2. In the evening, along with the 4th Ohio and 14th Indiana, it was sent to help stop the attack of Jubal Early on Cemetery Hill. In the autumn of that same year, the 7th participated in the Mine Run and Bristoe campaigns.

In February 1864, the 7th was engaged in fighting at Morton's Ford, and then took part in the Overland Campaign, including the Battle of the Wilderness and Spotsylvania, where it was involved in the attack on the Salient or "Bloody Angle." For the bulk of the year, the regiment was active during the Siege of Petersburg.

In early 1865, the 7th fought at the Battle of Hatcher's Run and then the fall of Petersburg. It subsequently marched in pursuit of the retreating Army of Northern Virginia during the Appomattox Campaign. The regiment marched in the Grand Review of the Armies in Washington, D.C., on May 23 before being transported to Louisville, Kentucky.

The 7th West Virginia was mustered out of Federal service on June 1, 1865.

== Casualties ==
During its term of service, the regiment lost 9 officers and 133 enlisted men killed and mortally wounded, and 4 officers and 154 enlisted men by disease, for a total of 300 fatalities.

== Colonels ==
- Joseph Snider
- Jonathan Lockwood
- Henry C. Skiles

== See also ==
- West Virginia Units in the Civil War
- West Virginia in the Civil War
