= 14th Indiana Infantry Regiment =

14th Indiana Volunteer Infantry Regiment
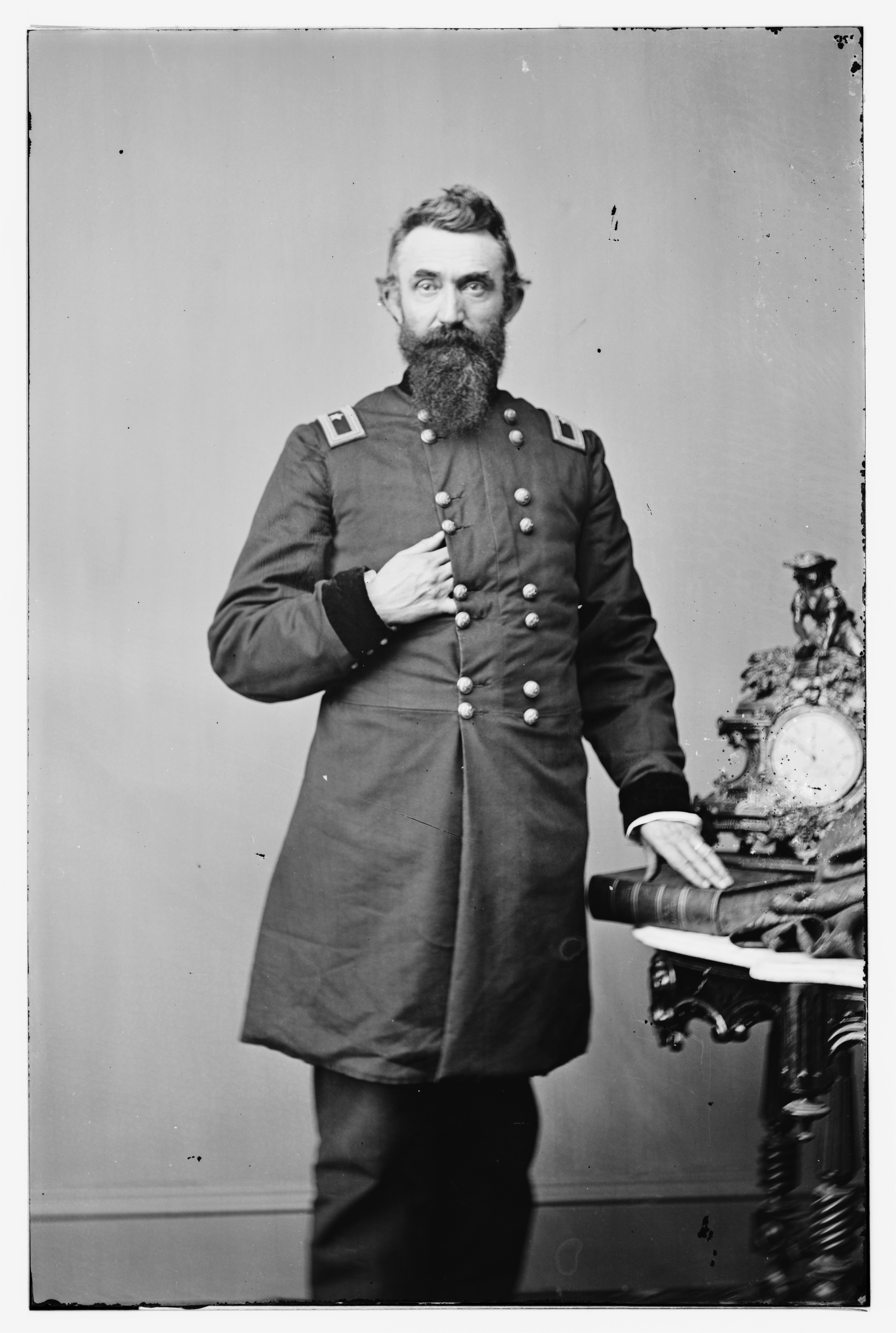
- Brigadier General Nathan Kimball, the first commander of the 14th Indiana
- Active: May 5, 1861 to June 16, 1864
- Country: United States
- Allegiance: Union
- Branch: Infantry
- Engagements: Battle of Rich Mountain; Battle of Cheat Mountain; Battle of Greenbrier River; Battle of South Mountain; Battle of Antietam; Battle of Fredericksburg; Battle of Chancellorsville; Battle of Gettysburg; Battle of the Wilderness; Battle of Spotsylvania Court House; Battle of North Anna; Battle of Totopotomoy Creek; Battle of Cold Harbor

The 14th Indiana Infantry Regiment, called "The Gallant Fourteenth", was an infantry regiment and part of the Union Army's celebrated "Gibraltar Brigade" during the American Civil War. Mustered on June 7, 1861, it was the state's first regiment organized for three years' service. The 14th Indiana served in many major campaigns and battles mostly in the Eastern Theater. During its three years of service, the regiment had a total of 222 casualties (11 officers and 211 enlisted men).

The 14th Indiana fought at the Battle of Antietam, the Second Battle of Fredericksburg, the Battle of Chancellorsville, and at the Battle of Gettysburg. At Gettysburg, the 14th Indiana helped secure Cemetery Hill. From August 16 to September 6, 1863, the regiment was detached for duty in New York City to help prevent further violence following the New York City draft riots of July 1863. After its return to active duty, the regiment fought in the Bristoe Campaign and the Mine Run Campaign, as well as several major battles, including the Battle of the Wilderness and the Battle of Spotsylvania Court House. The Battle of Cold Harbor was the regiment's final engagement before it left the front on June 6, 1864. Soldiers who had chosen not to re-enlist were mustered out on June 16, 1864, at Indianapolis; the remaining soldiers were transferred to the 20th Regiment Indiana Infantry.

== Service ==
=== May–June 1861 ===
The 14th Indiana was organized at Camp Vigo, near Terre Haute, Indiana, on May 5, 1861, as one of six Indiana regiments formed for one year of service. However, in response to Lincoln's call on May 3 for more than 42,000 troops to serve for three-year terms, the regiment reorganized for three years of service and mustered into the Union army on June 7, 1861. It was the state's first regiment organized for three years of service. The 14th Indiana, which consisted of 1,134 men and officers, was initially under the command of Colonel Nathan Kimball.

=== July 1861–September 1862 ===
The 14th Indiana left Indianapolis, Indiana, on July 5, 1861, and arrived at Clarksburg, West Virginia, later that month. Assigned to the 1st Brigade, Army of Occupation, West Virginia, the regiment was sent to Rich Mountain, where it served as reserve troops in the Battle of Rich Mountain (July 11, 1861), but it did not engage in the fight. Afterwards, the regiment was posted to Cheat Mountain, where it remained until September 1861. The 14th Indiana saw action at Greenbrier River (October 3–4, 1861) and spent the winter in quarters at Romney and Paw Paw in present-day West Virginia.

From January to March 1862, the 14th Indiana was attached to the 1st Brigade, Lander's Division, Department of Western Virginia. During this period the regiment took part in the First Battle of Kernstown, a Union victory near Winchester, Virginia, on March 23, 1862.

The regiment continued to serve in Virginia and Maryland from March to May 1862 in the 1st Brigade, 2nd Division, Army of the Potomac, and the Department of the Shenandoah. In May and June the 14th Indiana was attached to the 1st Brigade, Shields's 2nd Division, Department of the Rappahannock, and from June to September 1862 it served in Nathan Kimball's Independent Brigade, 2nd Army Corps, Army of the Potomac. When General Shields was wounded on March 22, 1862, Colonel Kimball took command of the division and Lieutenant Colonel William Harrow succeeded Kimball as the 14th Indiana's regimental leader. The 14th Indiana remained in the Army of the Potomac until June 1864.

=== September 1862–March 1864 ===
The 14th Indiana served in the 1st Brigade, 3rd Division, 2nd Army Corps, from September 1862 to March 1864. In September 1862, the 14th Indiana took part in the Maryland Campaign, including service as reserve troops in the Battle of South Mountain (September 14, 1862), and fought in the Battle of Antietam (September 12–15, 1862) After Antietam, Kimball's Independent Brigade, which included the 14th Indiana, was given the nickname of the "Gibraltar Brigade" for maintaining its position along the Sunken Road and for its assault on Confederate forces, driving them from the battlefield.

==== Antietam ====
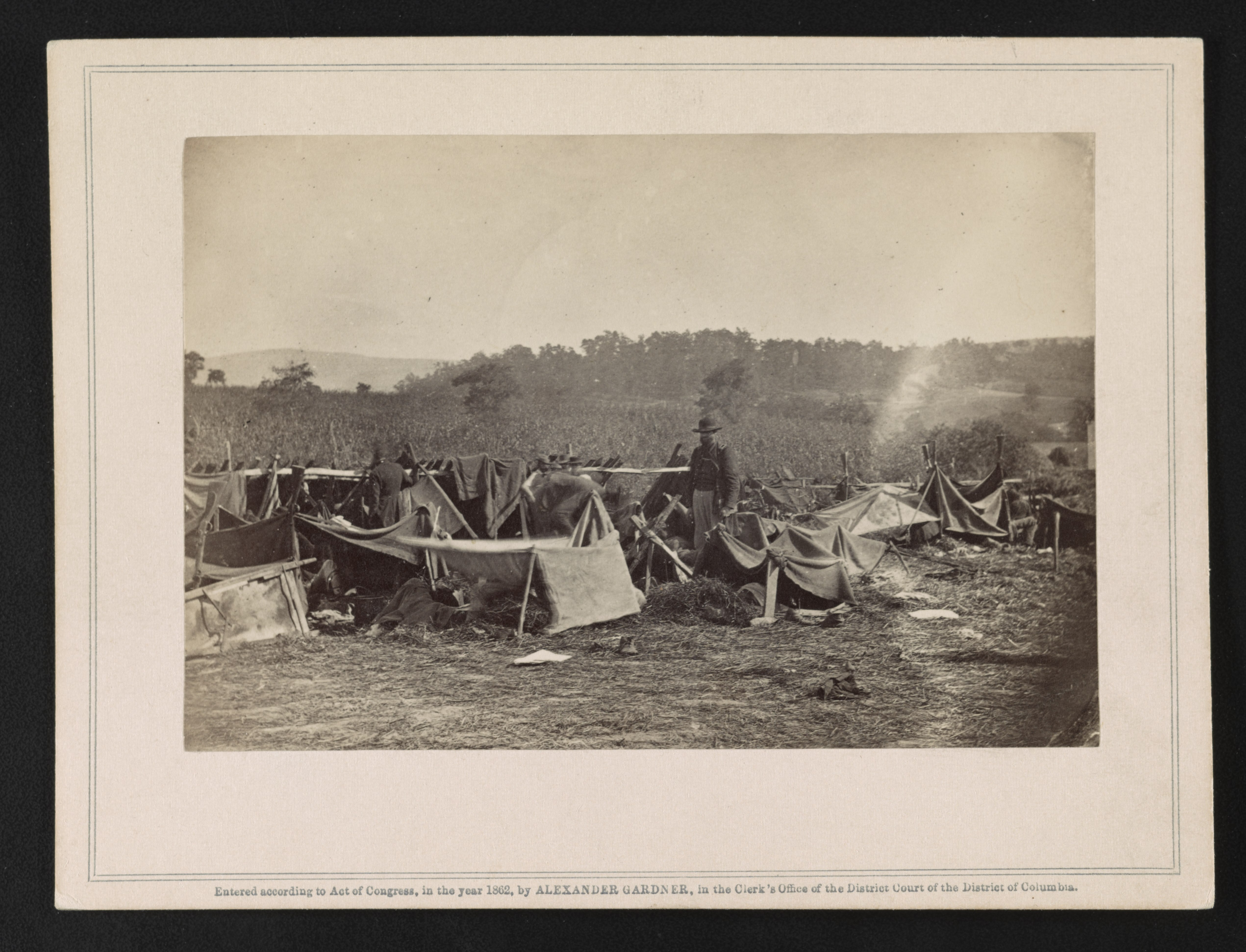
"Dr. A. Hurd, 14th Indiana Volunteers, attending to Confederate wounded after the Battle of Antietam."

Colonel William Harrow's official report of September 19, 1862, described the 14th Indiana's actions on the morning of September 17. During the early hours of battle, the regiment passed through an orchard and into an open, plowed field. The 14th Indiana engaged for about four hours under heavy fire within 60 yards (55 m) of Confederate forces occupying the Sunken Road. Although they suffered heavy casualties, the 14th Indiana and the 8th Ohio Volunteer Infantry regiments held their positions. The Confederate force retired from battle in the early afternoon, but the Indiana regiment continued at arms until nightfall, under fire from Confederate batteries, before it was finally relieved. Of the 14th Indiana's 320 men who went into battle, 31 were killed and an estimated 150 were wounded. (Note: See transcript of an official report of the 14th Indiana's role in the battle of Antietam.)

After the battle, the regiment marched to Harper's Ferry, then moved to Warrenton, Virginia, and Falmouth, Virginia. The regiment remained inactive at Falmouth until December 1862.

==== Fredericksburg ====
The 14th Indiana took part in the Second Battle of Fredericksburg (December 12–15, 1862). On December 12, the 14th Indiana was part of column of Union troops that attempted to storm the Confederates' fortified the breastworks under heavy artillery fire. Unable to take the Confederate position, the 14th Indiana was forced to withdraw. After the Union defeat at Fredericksburg, the 14th Indiana returned Falmouth, Virginia, where it spent the winter.

Colonel John Coons replaced Nathan Kimball, who was severely injured in the battle, as commander of the 14th Indiana. Kimball recovered from his wounds and was promoted to brigadier general. He resumed active duty in the Western Theater for the remainder of the war. (Note: See transcripts of official reports describing the 14th Indiana's role in the battle at Fredericksburg.)

==== Chancellorsville ====
The 14th Indiana was involved in the Union defeat at the Battle of Chancellorsville (May 1–5, 1863). After being held in reserve during the first two days of the battle, the regiment moved to the front on the morning of May 3. It attacked Confederate troops about 8 a.m., driving them from their positions. The 14th Indiana held its ground during an engagement that lasted about three hours. Unable to advance, the 14th Indiana reoccupied positions that General Sykes's division had once held and fortified them by constructing rifle pits and placing skirmishers in front of the breastworks. Although the regiment was eventually driven back, its efforts delayed the Confederate advance, which allowed the Union's 11th and 12th Corps to restore its line.

On May 4, the 14th Indiana remained behind temporary fortifications, and on May 5, other than skirmishes with its pickets, the regiment did not engage with the Confederates. On the evening of May 5, the regiment received orders to leave its position and return to the Rappahannock River, which the men had forded a few days earlier. Lieutenant Colonel Elijah H. C. Cavins of the 14th Indiana reported on May 10, 1863, that the regiment's casualties were 7 killed and 50 wounded. (Note: See transcripts of official reports of the 14th Indiana's role in the battle at Chancellorsville.)

==== Gettysburg ====
The regiment took part in the Battle of Gettysburg (July 2–4, 1863), when Union General George Meade's Army of the Potomac defeated Confederate General Robert E. Lee's Army of Northern Virginia at Gettysburg, Pennsylvania, a small town intersected by numerous roads and surrounded by hills. The 14th Indiana arrived late in the day on July 1, too late to join in the battle, when the Confederate troops forced the Union's 1st Corps and 11th Corps to retreat to Cemetery Hill, about a half-mile south of town.

On the morning of July 2, the 14th Indiana was deployed into position for an afternoon charge, and was sent to the front as relief troops to General Howard's 11th Corps late in the day. The 14th Indiana was among those ordered to protect the exposed batteries at Cemetery Hill as part of the First Brigade, Hay's Division. Colonel John Coons, commander of the regiment at Gettysburg, reported that the 14th Indiana initially supported Woodruff's battery near the center of the battle line in the morning. By 4:30 in the afternoon it was under continuous artillery fire from the Confederates. Around 6 p.m. Colonel Samuel S. Carroll ordered Colonel Coons's men to shift its support to the Union batteries on the right of the cemetery. These batteries had already lost their support from the 11th Corps. In addition, the Confederates had crested Cemetery Hill, capturing one of the Union guns. With the 7th West Virginia and 4th Ohio Infantry, the 14th Indiana advanced with fixed bayonets, forming a line along a stone fence to defend Cemetery Hill. These Union forces kept the Confederates from capturing Rickett's battery and forced them to retreat down the hill. (Note: See transcripts of official reports of the 14th Indiana's role in the battle at Gettysburg.)

On July 3, the 14th Indiana remained with General Winfield Scott Hancock's 2nd Corps; however, the regiment was not involved in what became known as Pickett's Charge, when the Confederates assaulted the Union line and were repulsed several times before they finally retreated, ending the three-day battle. Colonel Coons reported that the 14th Indiana engaged with the Confederates to the right of the cemetery all day on July 3, under heavy crossfire from artillery, but suffered few losses. (Note: See transcripts of official reports of the 14th Indiana's role in the battle at Gettysburg.) When Lee's army retreated south, the 14th Indiana pursued the Confederate troops to Manassas Gap, Virginia.

During the fighting at Gettysburg, the 14th Indiana sustained heavy losses. A total of 123 of its enlisted men and officers were killed or wounded. Corporal Isaac Norris, the flag bearer of Company H, was among those who were killed. Norris was buried on the field where he died, which became the future site of a 14-foot (4.3 m) regimental monument that was erected in 1885.

==== New York City draft riots ====
On August 16, 1863, the 14th Indiana was detached for duty in New York, following violent New York City draft riots (July 13–16, 1863). The riots were the result of the passage of the Enrollment Act in March 1863 that required men between the ages of 20 and 45 to register for the draft. The U.S. Congress hoped that the laws would encourage enlistments in the Union army, but a legal loophole allowed draftees to pay a commutation fee of $300 or arrange for substitutes to serve in their place. For many in the North, payment of the commutation fee to avoid conscription was highly unpopular. Civil unrest occurred at several sites around in the United States, but the draft riots in New York City caused more than a hundred deaths and the destruction of numerous buildings. Local militias and federal troops, including the 14th Indiana, were called to New York City to help prevent further rioting. The regiment remained stationed on Governors Island from August 16 to September 6, 1863.

=== Other campaigns in the East ===
In October 1863 the 14th Indiana rejoined the 2nd Corps, Army of the Potomac, and returned to active duty. Later that year the regiment participated in several battles in the eastern United States, including service in the Bristoe Campaign (October 9–22, 1863) and the Mine Run Campaign (November 26–December 2, 1863), before spending the winter at Stevensburg, Virginia. Fighting resumed in February 1864 along the Rapidan River.

From March to June 1864, the regiment was assigned to the Army of the Potomac's 3rd Brigade, 2nd Division, 2nd Army Corps. During that time the regiment saw action in several major battles, including the Battle of the Wilderness (May 5–7, 1864).

==== Spotsylvania Court House ====
At the Battle of Spotsylvania Court House (May 12–21, 1864), the 14th Indiana charged the Confederate breastworks and engaged in hand-to-hand combat. Colonel John Coons was among those from the 14th Indiana who died in the battle. After several days of fighting, the Confederate troops surrendered.

==== Cold Harbor ====
The Battle of Cold Harbor (June 1–6, 1864) was the regiment's last engagement. George E. Mull of Company H, 14th Indiana, was killed only hours before the end of his military service.

=== End of service ===
The 14th Indiana left the front on June 6, 1864. Those in the regiment who had completed their military service mustered out on June 20, 1864, in Indianapolis. (Note: Several secondary sources indicate the discharge date was backdated to June 16, 1864, but the more likely date is June 6, 1864, the day the 14th Indiana left the front after the Battle of Cold Harbor (June 1–6, 1864) and three years after mustering into service on June 6, 1861.)

The regiment's veterans who had re-enlisted and its remaining recruits who had not yet completed their military service were transferred to the 20th Regiment Indiana Infantry. (The 20th Indiana mustered out of service at Louisville, Kentucky, on July 12, 1865.)

== Casualties ==
The 14th Indiana suffered a total of 222 fatalities during its three years of service. The regiment lost 11 officers and 139 enlisted men who were killed in battle or died from wounds; 72 enlisted men died from disease.

== Commanders ==
- Colonel Nathan Kimball (promoted to brigadier general, April 15, 1862)
- Colonel William Harrow (promoted to brigadier general, November 29, 1862; resigned, January 2, 1863)
- Colonel John Coons (killed in action at the Battle of Spotsylvania Court House, May 12, 1864)

== Regimental monuments ==
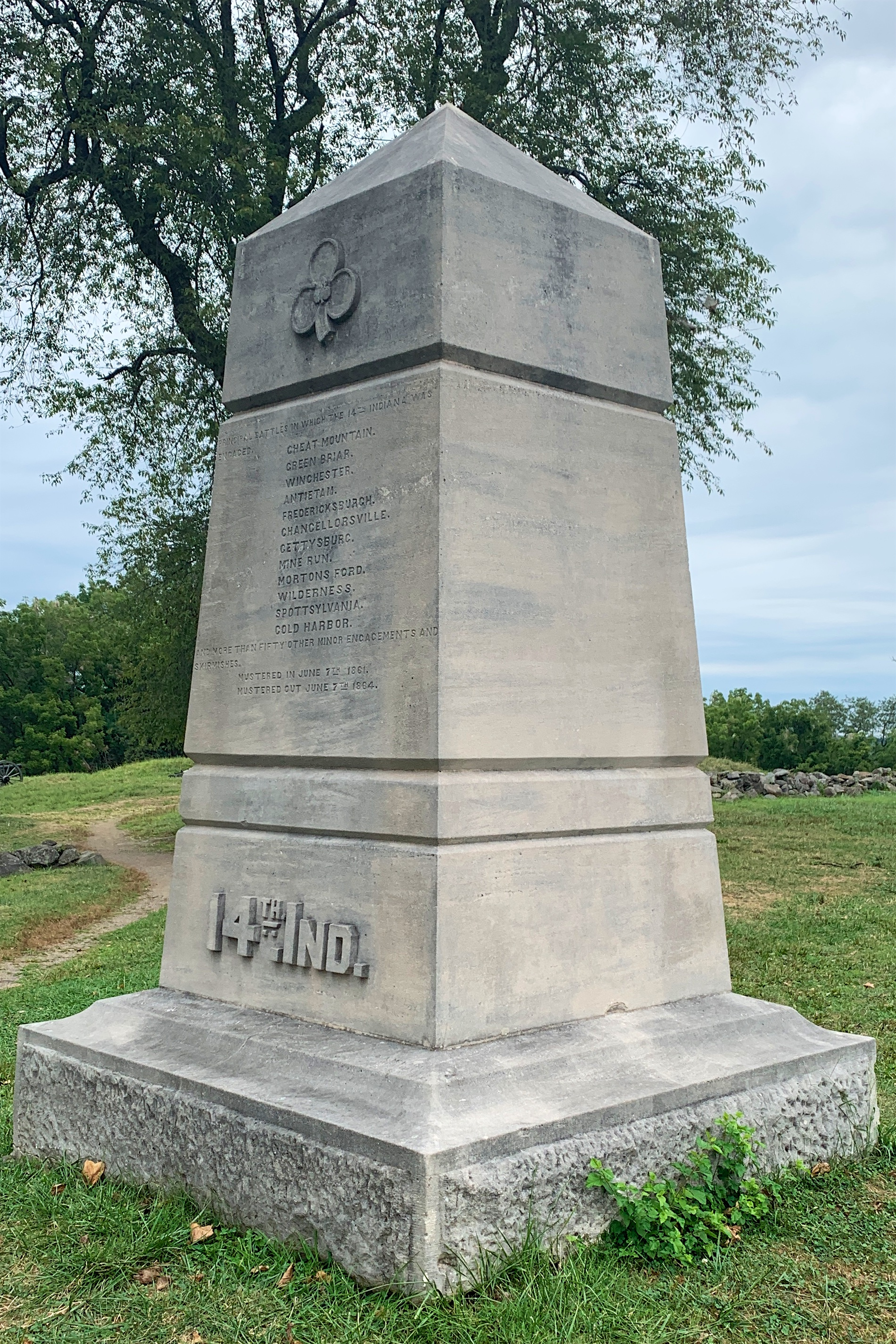
Monument on East Cemetery Hill, Gettysburg

- A stone regimental marker commemorating the 14th Indiana's service at the Battle of Antietam is located on the north side of the Sunken Road.
- The Indiana state government dedicated a monument to the 14th Indiana Volunteers on the Gettysburg battlefield in 1885. Made of Indiana limestone, the 14-foot (4.3 m) memorial is located on East Cemetery Hill, adjacent to a statue of Major General Winfield S. Hancock. The monument marks the location where Isaac Morris, the regiment's color-bearer, was killed on July 2, 1863.

== See also ==
- List of Indiana Civil War regiments
- Indiana in the Civil War

== Notes/References/Sources ==
Notes

Sources

- Baxter, Nancy Niblack (2008). Gallant Fourteenth: The Story of an Indiana Civil War Regiment (4th ed.). Carmel, IN: Hawthorne Publishing. ISBN 978-0-9787167-8-3. OCLC 314788843.
- Beem, David E. (1884). "Military History of Owen County". In Blanchard, Charles (ed.). Counties of Clay and Owen, Indiana: Historical and Biographical (pdf). Chicago, IL: F.A. Battey & Co. pp. 627–638. OCLC 32151252. This article incorporates text from this source, which is in the public domain.
- Dyer, Frederick Henry (1908). A Compendium of the War of the Rebellion (PDF). Des Moines, IA: Dyer Pub. Co. p. 1124. ASIN B01BUFJ76Q. This article incorporates text from this source, which is in the public domain.
- Federal Publishing Company (1908). Military Affairs and Regimental Histories of New Jersey, Indiana, Illinois and Michigan (PDF). The Union Army: A History of Military Affairs in the Loyal States, 1861–65 – Records of the Regiments in the Union army – Cyclopedia of battles – Memoirs of Commanders and Soldiers. Vol. III. Madison, WI: Federal Publishing Company. pp. 117–118. OCLC 694018100. This article incorporates text from this source, which is in the public domain.
- Frassanito, William A. (1978). Antietam: The Photographic Legacy of America's Bloodiest Day. New York, NY: Scribner. ISBN 978-0-684-15659-0. OCLC 3706534.
- McPherson, James M. (1988). Battle Cry of Freedom: The Civil War Era (PDF). Oxford History of the United States (1st ed.). Oxford, UK: Oxford University Press. p. 904. ISBN 978-0-19-503863-7. OCLC 7577667.
- Terrell, William Henry Harrison (1869). Report of the Adjutant General of the State of Indiana (pdf). Indiana Adjutant General Reports. Vol. I. Indianapolis, IN: A.H. Connor State Printer. pp. 12, 13, 31, 2. OCLC 558004259. This article incorporates text from this source, which is in the public domain.
- Terrell, William Henry Harrison (1865). Report of the Adjutant General of the State of Indiana (pdf). Indiana Adjutant General Reports. Vol. II. Indianapolis, IN: A.H. Connor State Printer. pp. 99–112. OCLC 558004259. This article incorporates text from this source, which is in the public domain.
- Thornbrough, Emma Lou (1989) [1965]. Indiana in the Civil War Era, 1850–1882 (pdf). The History of Indiana. Vol. III. Indianapolis, IN: Indiana Historical Society. pp. 144–147. ISBN 978-0-87195-050-5. OCLC 26319135.
- U.S. War Department (1884). Operations in Northern Virginia, West Virginia, Maryland, and Pennsylvania. Sep 3-Nov 14, 1862, Part I - Operations in Northern Virginia, West Virginia, Maryland and Pennsylvania. September 3-November 14, 1862. The War of the Rebellion: A Compilation of the Official Records of the Union and Confederate Armies. Vol. XIX-XXXI-I. Washington, DC: U.S. Government Printing Office. pp. 328–329. hdl:2027/coo.31924079609610. OCLC 29216042. This article incorporates text from this source, which is in the public domain.
- U.S. War Department (1889). Operations in Northern Virginia, West Virginia, Maryland, and Pennsylvania. November 15, 1862 – January 25, 1863. The War of the Rebellion: A Compilation of the Official Records of the Union and Confederate Armies. Vol. XXI–XXXIII. Washington, DC: U.S. Government Printing Office. pp. 286–291. hdl:2027/coo.31924077723017. OCLC 857196196. This article incorporates text from this source, which is in the public domain.
- U.S. War Department (1889). Operations in Northern Virginia, West Virginia, Maryland, and Pennsylvania. January 26 – June 3, 1863 – Reports. The War of the Rebellion: A Compilation of the Official Records of the Union and Confederate Armies. Vol. XXV-XXXVII-I. Washington, DC: U.S. Government Printing Office. pp. 362–368. hdl:2027/coo.31924077730244. OCLC 857196196. This article incorporates text from this source, which is in the public domain.
- U.S. War Department (1889). Operations in North Carolina, Virginia, West Virginia, Maryland, Pennsylvania, and Department of the East. June 3 – August 3, 1863 – Reports. The War of the Rebellion: A Compilation of the Official Records of the Union and Confederate Armies. Vol. XXVII-XXXIX-I. Washington, DC: U.S. Government Printing Office. pp. 158, 176, 457–459, 463, 714. hdl:2027/coo.31924077699761. OCLC 857196196. This article incorporates text from this source, which is in the public domain.
- "Nathan Kimball". www.battlefields.org. American Battlefield Trust. January 13, 2009.
- Brady, Hillary (2016). "Northern Draft Riots During the Civil War". Digital Public Library of America.
- "14th Regiment Infantry". The Civil War Archives. American Civil War Archive. 2016.
- Hawks, Steve A. (2016). "Battle of Gettysburg: Union Monuments: 14th Indiana Volunteer Infantry Regiment". Stone Sentinels.
- Hawks, Steve A. (2017). "Union Monuments: 14th Indiana Volunteer Infantry Regiment". Stone Sentinels.
- "Indiana Battle Flag Inventory". Indiana War Memorial. May 4, 2021.
