= Gibraltar Brigade =

The "Gibraltar Brigade" was a famed infantry brigade within the Army of the Potomac during the American Civil War. Recognizing its tenacity in combat at the Battle of Antietam, Brigadier General William French assigned the nickname as a comparison to the steadfastness of the Rock of Gibraltar. At Antietam the 8th Ohio Infantry, 14th Indiana Infantry, 7th West Virginia Infantry and 132nd Pennsylvania (a nine-month regiment) comprised the Brigade. The 4th Ohio Infantry Regiment was forced to miss the Maryland Campaign due to regiment-wide sickness but was otherwise a consistent member of the Brigade. It served in many of the major battles of the Eastern Theater.

During the Battle of East Cemetery Hill at Gettysburg on July 2, 1863, nine cannons from Wiedrich's and Ricketts' Batteries had been silenced and remained in violently disputed possession. As the Union cannoneers and Confederate riflemen from Louisiana and North Carolina engaged hand-to-hand, both sides waited for decisive reinforcement. While none of the anticipated help arrived for the Confederates, six Union infantry regiments counterattacked across the Baltimore Pike to assist their artillery comrades.

Three regiments from the Gibraltar Brigade marched in column at double-quick time from Zeigler's Grove across the length (west to east) of Evergreen Cemetery. The column split into two at the Gatehouse (with the 7th West Virginia on its left side and the 8th Ohio and the 14th Indiana on its right), crossed the Baltimore Pike, left-faced into line of battle, and attacked with bayonets. Among the three, the 14th Indiana arrived first to rescue Ricketts' Battery.

Another portion of the brigade helped repulse Pickett's Charge the following day.

Through much of the war, the Gibraltar Brigade was composed of the 4th Ohio Infantry, 8th Ohio Infantry, 14th Indiana Infantry, and the 7th West Virginia Infantry. The brigade was augmented by the 24th and 28th New Jersey before the Battle of Fredericksburg. Before the Overland Campaign in early 1864, its ranks were bolstered by the addition of the 14th Connecticut, 1st Delaware, 108th New York, 12th New Jersey, and the 10th New York Battalion.

Its commanders included Nathan Kimball, Samuel S. Carroll, and Thomas A. Smyth.
