= 8th Ohio Infantry Regiment =

- Active: 1861–1864
- Country: United States
- Branch: United States Army; Union Army
- Type: Infantry
- Size: 950 soldiers at outset of the war
- Nickname: "Fighting Fools"
- Engagements: American Civil War: Hanging Rock Pass; Antietam; Gettysburg; The Wilderness; Cold Harbor

The 8th Ohio Infantry Regiment was an infantry regiment in the Union Army during the American Civil War. It served in the Eastern Theater in a number of campaigns and battles, but perhaps is most noted for its actions in helping repulse Pickett's Charge during the Battle of Gettysburg.

== Three-months regiment ==
On April 12, 1861, Confederate forces that had recently seceded from the Union fired upon Federal controlled Fort Sumter in Charleston, South Carolina. In response to the attack, President Abraham Lincoln called for 75,000 volunteers to put down the rebellion. Hundreds of men from northeastern Ohio were quick to respond, volunteering for three months of military service. The 8th Ohio Infantry Regiment was organized in Cleveland between April 18 and May 4, 1861. In June, the regiment moved via train to Camp Dennison near Cincinnati for training and garrison duty. It mustered out June 22, having not left the Buckeye State.

Among the early recruits in Company F was Fremont dentist Everton Conger, who later in the war led the cavalry that tracked down and killed President Abraham Lincoln's assassin, John Wilkes Booth. Conger did not re-enlist in the regiment after his term expired, instead joining the 3rd West Virginia Cavalry.

Another future notable who initially served in the 8th Ohio was William E. Haynes, who would become a U.S. congressman from Ohio.

== Three-years regiment ==
=== Early service ===
Many of the three-months men reenlisted for three years on June 22–24, and the regiment was mustered in on June 26 under Col. Herman S. DePuy of Sandusky. On the evening of July 8, the regiment loaded onto trains and traveled to Grafton, Virginia, termed the "seat of war" by Lt. Col. Franklin Sawyer. From July 1861 through March 1862, the regiment was a part of George B. McClellan's army in the conflicts during the West Virginia Campaign. During this time, the regiment fought a series of small skirmishes around Beverly, Grafton, and Romney in the Appalachians, but saw no serious combat.

On March 1, 1862, the 8th Ohio moved to Winchester, Virginia, located in the Shenandoah Valley. There the regiment was brigaded with the 4th Ohio, 14th Indiana, and 7th West Virginia Infantry. During the next two and a half years, this brigade would primarily serve in the Army of the Potomac and would become known as the "Gibraltar Brigade." Initially, the brigade was commanded by Brig. Gen. Nathan Kimball of the 14th Indiana in Maj. Gen. James Shields's division. While in the Shenandoah Valley, the regiment participated in its first real battle, Kernstown, where it attacked and defeated a portion of Stonewall Jackson's force, while suffering almost twenty-five percent casualties. In all, the 8th listed forty-six men as killed or wounded.

In September 1862, during the Maryland Campaign, the regiment and the rest of the II Corps hastily marched northward in pursuit of Robert E. Lee's Army of Northern Virginia. The two armies met near Sharpsburg, Maryland, along the banks of Antietam Creek. Here, the 8th experienced what to date was its hardest fighting of the war. Kimball's brigade repeatedly attacked Alabama troops under D. H. Hill stationed in a sunken road during the Battle of Antietam, taking 50% casualties but eventually pushing through the defensive line at a cost of 162 officers and men killed or wounded.

In early December, replenished by new recruits, the 8th Ohio participated in the Battle of Fredericksburg, where it was initially assigned as skirmishers after crossing the Rappahannock River on pontoon bridges. The regiment took shelter inside a cluster of buildings in the town of Fredericksburg approximately 150 yards from the Confederate line. From the comparative safety of their position, the men witnessed the series of bloody and futile attacks on Marye's Heights ordered by Ambrose Burnside. After firing relentlessly for hours from the houses and with its ammunition exhausted, the 8th Ohio withdrew under heavy enemy fire to the rear of the Union line.

Following the disaster at Fredericksburg, the 8th Ohio encamped until April 1863 in the town of Falmouth, Virginia. In May, Lt. Col. Franklin Sawyer and the regiment (and most of the II Corps) served as reserves during the Chancellorsville Campaign.

=== Gettysburg ===
On June 3, 1863, elements of Lee's army began heading away from Fredericksburg towards the Shenandoah Valley. In response, the Union army, first under Joseph Hooker and then under George G. Meade, slowly began to pursue Lee into Maryland and subsequently into south-central Pennsylvania. The regiment lost a number of men to sunstroke and heat exhaustion during the brutal march northward, but arrived near Gettysburg, Pennsylvania, late in the day of July 1 and took up a defensive position along Cemetery Ridge with 209 men in its ranks. When James Longstreet and A. P. Hill launched attacks aimed at rolling up the Union line from south to north, the 8th was quickly shifted to a position near the Emmitsburg Road, where it engaged in a series of attacks and counterattacks on July 2 with Mississippi troops under Brig. Gen. Carnot Posey, while the rest of the brigade (now under Col. Samuel "Red" Carroll) was sent to Cemetery Hill to reinforce the embattled XI Corps.

After a restless night, the 8th held their position in the fields west of Emmitsburg Road, dueling with Confederate skirmishers for much of the morning of July 3. Following a lengthy cannonade in the early afternoon, over 12,000 Confederates under George Pickett, Isaac R. Trimble, and Johnston Pettigrew stepped off from Seminary Ridge and marched towards the Union line on Cemetery Ridge. Facing a force several times its number, the 8th Ohio held its advanced position and was able to flank portions of a Virginia brigade under Col. John M. Brockenbrough. Assisted by artillery fire from Cemetery Hill and Ziegler's Grove, the 8th succeeded in routing much of Brockenbrough's force, the first brigade to ever break and flee during Lee's tenure in command of the Army of Northern Virginia. The 8th then shifted and poured fire into the flank of other Confederate regiments. As the assault waned, the regiment collected over 300 prisoners of war. As the Ohioans reentered the Union lines, they were given a salute of arms and cheers from the other regiments.

The 8th Ohio rested on July 4 before joining the Army of the Potomac in the pursuit of the retreating Confederates into Virginia. It served in the subsequent Bristoe and Mine Run Campaigns, but saw no further significant combat in 1863.

=== 1864 actions ===
The 8th Ohio Infantry did not see significant fighting until the Overland Campaign. On May 8, the regiment halted a Confederate assault on the Union lines in the dense woods known as the Wilderness. The next day, the regiment was again attacked and managed to hold its ground despite serious losses. After fighting at the Battle of Spotsylvania Court House, the 8th marched southward as Ulysses S. Grant continually sidestepped Lee and relentlessly moved towards Richmond and Petersburg. With only three weeks left in their original three-year term of enlistment, on June 1 the regiment was sent forward in the ill-fated attacks at the Battle of Cold Harbor, where it again suffered considerable casualties before withdrawing. After the attack at Cold Harbor, the regiment was placed in reserve until its enlistment expired. On June 24, the regiment withdrew from Petersburg and was sent back to Ohio. A number of men stayed in the service and were transferred to Company A, 4th Ohio Infantry on June 24–25.

After days of celebrations and salutes, the regiment officially mustered out of service on July 13, 1864, with only 168 men left in the ranks. The 8th Ohio lost during service 8 officers and 124 enlisted men killed and mortally wounded, and 1 officer and 72 enlisted men by disease (a total of 205 fatalities).

After fighting in most of the major campaigns of the Army of the Potomac, the 8th Ohio had acquired a reputation as one of the best fighting units in the Union army. It is memorialized with monuments at Antietam and Gettysburg, as well as an inscription at the Soldiers' and Sailors' Monument in Cleveland's Public Square. Its national battle flag is in the collection of the Ohio Historical Society in Columbus, and some artifacts and records in the Western Reserve Historical Society.

== Medal of Honor recipients ==
Three men from the regiment received the Medal of Honor for their actions during the Civil War:

- John G. Miller, Corporal, Company G - (Gettysburg): "Capture of two flags")
- James Richmond, Private, Company F - (Gettysburg): "Capture of flag"
- Lewis A. Rounds, Private, Company D - (Spotsylvania): "Capture of flag"

== See also ==
- Ohio in the Civil War
- List of Ohio units in the American Civil War
