= Second Battle of Kernstown order of battle =

The order of battle for the Second Battle of Kernstown includes:

- Second Battle of Kernstown order of battle: Confederate
- Second Battle of Kernstown order of battle: Union

== See also ==
- First Battle of Kernstown
- First Battle of Kernstown order of battle
