= Danville Artillery =

- Flag of Virginia
- Active: April 22, 1861 to April 9, 1865
- Country: Confederate States of America
- Allegiance: Confederate
- Branch: Army
- Type: Artillery
- Size: Battery of four field guns
- Nicknames: Shumaker's Company, Wooding's Company, Price's Company, Rice's Company
- Stars and Bars
- Equipment: M1857 12-pound Napoleon, Whitworth, M1841 6-pounder, 3-inch rifled gun
- Engagements: American Civil War, Cheat Mountain, Valley Campaign, First Kernstown, McDowell, Princeton Courthouse, Front Royal, Winchester, Cross Keys, Port Republic, Sharpsburg, Chancellorsville, Fredericksburg, Cold Harbor, Seven Days Battles, Gaines' Mill, Malvern Hill, Gettysburg, Siege of Petersburg, Appomattox Court House

Commanders
- 1st: Captain Lindsay M. Shumaker
- 2nd: Captain George W. Wooding
- 3rd and Final: Captain R. Sidney Rice, Captain Berryman Z. Price

Insignia
- Army of Northern Virginia Battle Flag

The Danville Artillery was a field artillery company in the Confederate States Army, Army of Northern Virginia during the American Civil War. It was also referred to informally as a battery, although this reference was only infrequently used during the war.

Formed originally in Danville and the surrounding Pittsylvania County region in Virginia under the command of Captain Lindsay M. Shumaker, the Danville Artillery came into service April 22, 1861. Receiving its baptism of fire in the unsuccessful West Virginia Campaign, the company participated in General Robert E. Lee's Cheat Mountain Campaign and General Stonewall Jackson's Shenandoah Valley Campaign, and then served with Major L.M. Shumaker's and Major D.G. McIntosh's Battalion, Army of Northern Virginia.

Reorganized on April 21, 1862, with Captain George W. Wooding as its commander, the battery first fought under Jackson in the Shenandoah Valley. After the Valley Campaign, the battery followed Jackson through another year of battles.

Following the Battle of Sharpsburg, the ranks of the battery were revitalized when the men and equipment of the disbanded Eighth Star New Market Artillery joined the ranks. Following the reorganization, the battery was in action again at Fredericksburg, where Captain Wooding was killed, and up to Stonewall Jackson's last great tactical feat at Chancellorsville.

Under the command of Robert S. Rice, the battery continued to suffer heavier casualties with each battle as the war continued. The battery took an active part in the campaigns of the army from the Seven Days Battles to Cold Harbor and the Battle of Gettysburg, where it engaged Federal forces with its Napoleon and Whitworth artillery pieces on both the first and the second day of the battle.

At Gettysburg, the Danville Artillery was the first battery on the left with McIntosh's Artillery Battalion, Colonel Walker's Artillery Reserve, Pender's Division, Lieutenant General A.P. Hill's Third Army Corps, Army of Northern Virginia. It was also involved in the Petersburg siege south of the James River. The battery closed out its days under the command of Captain Berryman Z. Price.

On April 9, 1865, it surrendered 4 officers and 79 men at Appomattox.

It reported 1 killed and 3 wounded at Gaines' Mill and Malvern Hill, had 2 killed and 3 wounded during the Maryland Campaign (Sharpsburg), and lost 13 wounded at Fredericksburg. The unit had 3 wounded of the 114 engaged at Gettysburg and 8 wounded during the Briscoe Campaign. Captains Berryman Z. Price, R. Sidney Rice, Lindsay M. Shumaker, and George W. Wooding were its commanders.

The current Danville Artillery Battery has been in existence since the summer of 2003, and is composed of 3 field guns and camp equipment, over 20 reenactors and the M109A3 Deuce and a half truck Pandora's Box.

== Monuments and Markers ==
Danville Artillery (Rice's Company) Markers at Gettysburg National Military Park, located on Confederate Avenue, near the present-day Pennsylvania Army National Guard armory, on both sides of the road.

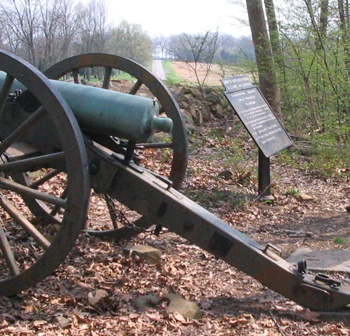

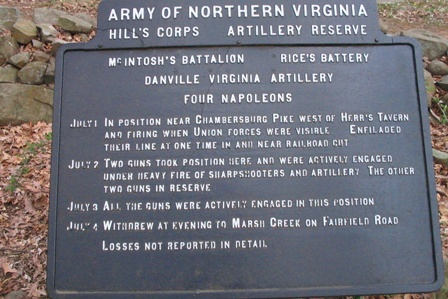

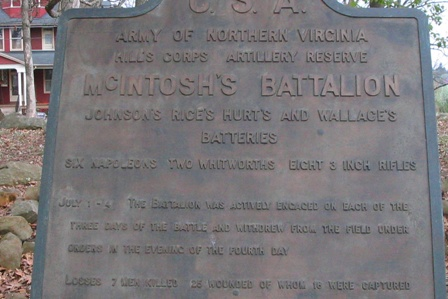

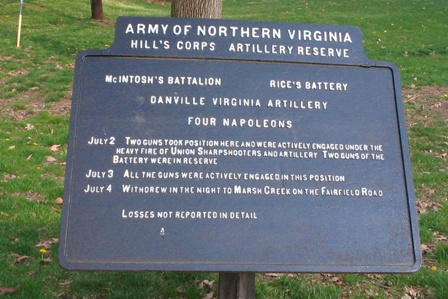

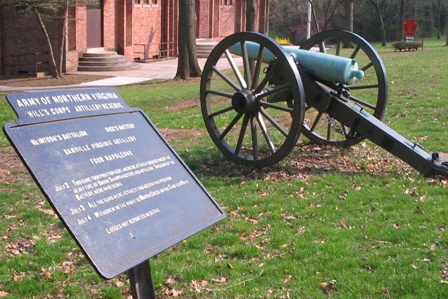

== See also ==
- List of Virginia Civil War units
