= Battle of Hatcher's Run order of battle =

The order of battle for the Battle of Hatcher's Run, also known as the Battle of Dabney's Mill, Armstrong's Mill, or Rowanty Creek includes:

- Battle of Hatcher's Run order of battle: Confederate, a subset of the Siege of Petersburg order of battle: Confederate
- Battle of Hatcher's Run order of battle: Union

== See also ==
- Siege of Petersburg order of battle
