= Battle of Cheat Mountain =

Battle of the American Civil War

Battle of Cheat Mountain (Battle of Cheat Summit Fort)
- Part of the American Civil War
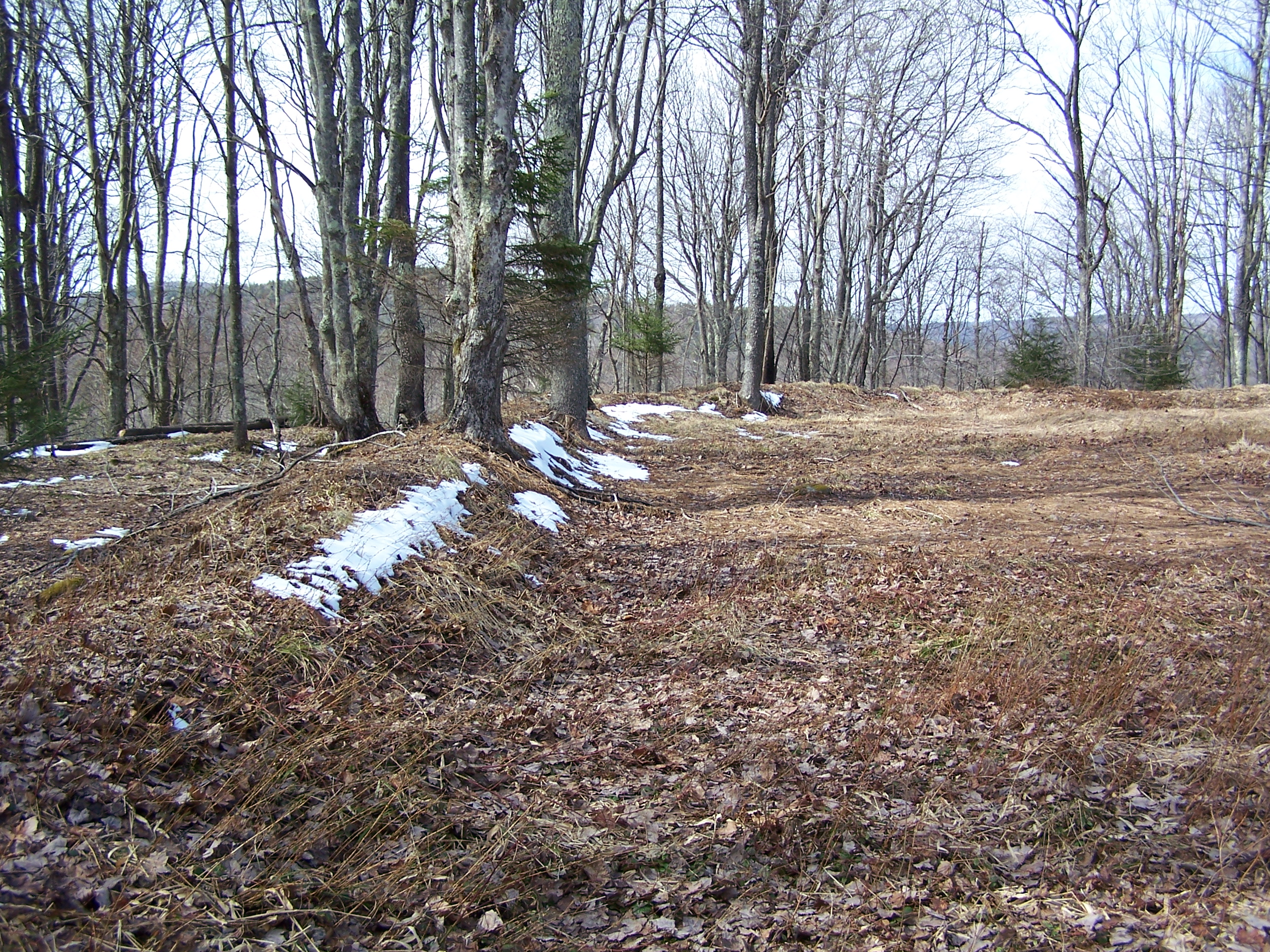
- Earthworks at Fort Milroy, pictured in 2006
Date	September 12–15, 1861
Location	Cheat Mountain, Pocahontas and Randolph Counties, Virginia (now West Virginia) 38°37′17″N 79°52′50″W
Result	Union victory

Belligerents
United States (Union)	Confederate States (Confederacy)

Commanders and leaders
Joseph J. Reynolds; Nathan Kimball; George R. Latham	Robert E. Lee; Samuel Read Anderson; Albert Rust; Henry R. Jackson

Strength
5,000	3,000

Casualties and losses
10 killed, 14 wounded, 64 captures (88 total)	~90 (exact amount unknown) 100 killed, 20 captured (Reynolds and Kimball)

The Battle of Cheat Mountain, also known as the Battle of Cheat Summit Fort, took place from September 12 to 15, 1861, in Pocahontas County and Randolph County, Virginia (now West Virginia) as part of the Western Virginia Campaign during the American Civil War. It was the first battle of the Civil War in which Robert E. Lee led troops into combat. During the battle, Lee attempted to surround the Union garrison atop Cheat Mountain, but the attack was never launched, due to false information from prisoners and poor communications among the various Confederate commands.

== Background ==
Starting in May 1861, Union forces commanded by Maj. Gen. George B. McClellan advanced from Ohio into the western region of Virginia, both to protect Ohio and Pennsylvania from invasion from Confederate troops and to help the pro-Union government of West Virginia located in Wheeling defeat Confederate incursions from eastern Virginia. Following his victory at Rich Mountain, McClellan was transferred to command the Army of the Potomac, leaving Brig. Gen. William Rosecrans in command of western Virginia. Rosecrans concentrated his forces to protect the major transportation lines in the region. Brig. Gen. Joseph J. Reynolds was left in command of the Cheat Mountain district, defending the Staunton and Parkersburg Turnpike with four regiments totaling 1,800 men. One regiment, the 14th Indiana commanded by Col. Nathan Kimball, defended Fort Milroy on Cheat Mountain, while the remaining three were at Camp Elkwater near the Tygart Valley River, where Reynolds established his headquarters.

Gen. Robert E. Lee was sent to western Virginia by Confederate President Jefferson Davis to coordinate the various Confederate forces in the region and regain lost Confederate territory. He arrived at the camps of the Army of the Northwest, commanded by Brig. Gen. William W. Loring, near the end of July; although he did not replace Loring, Lee did issue orders through him. After personally scouting the area around the Union positions, Lee devised a strategy that included a two-pronged simultaneous attack against Kimball's position on the summit of Cheat Mountain and against Reynolds's camp. The plan used Loring's Army of the Northwest, which was divided into six brigades for the battle. Brig. Gen. Henry R. Jackson's brigade would create a diversion in front of Fort Milroy while Colonel Albert Rust's brigade would make the main assault on the fort and Brig. Gen. Samuel Anderson's brigade would capture the turnpike west of the fort; Brig. Gen. Daniel Donelson and Col. Jesse S. Burke would seize the paths behind Camp Elkwater across the valley west of Cheat Mountain. with Col. William Gilham's brigade in reserve. Loring was given command of Burke's and Gilham's brigades during the battle. The battle plans were outlined to all commanders in special order No.27 dispatched by Lee, and the order was signed by Rust instead of Lee, who wanted to give Rust the credit of the plan and increase his subordinates' confidence in Rust. The plan of the battle was for the three columns commanded by Anderson (western column), Rust (center column approaching from east of the mountain) and Jackson's column (from due east of the mountain) to converge at the same time and attack the union fort at the summit. This was a difficult and complex maneuver for the inexperienced commanders. Rust's column was to initiate battle by firing volleys at the Union fort, at this signal the two other columns would also attack, and the column across the valley under Donelson would also attack Union troops defending Elkwater.

== Opposing forces ==
=== Union ===
West Virginia, Ohio, Indiana and Michigan infantry, cavalry and artillery regiments.

=== Confederate ===
Virginia, Tennessee and Arkansas infantry regiments.

== Battle ==
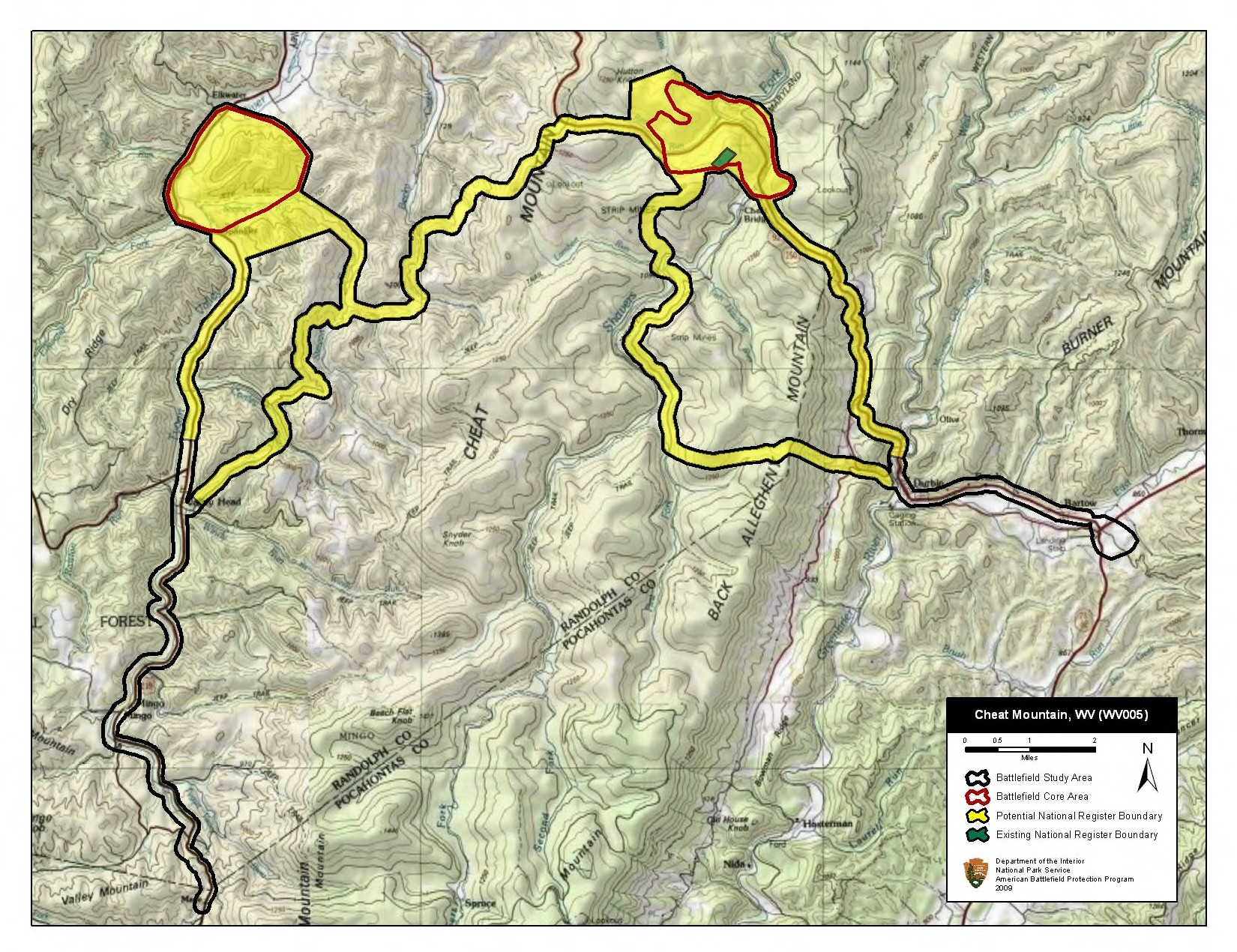
Map of Cheat Mountain Battlefield core and study areas by the American Battlefield Protection Program.

The approaches by each of the three Confederate brigades were uncoordinated. Rain, fog, mountainous terrain, and a dense forest limited visibility to minimal distances. As a result, each of the three Confederate brigades assigned to attack Cheat Summit Fort acted independently and never made contact with either of the other two Confederate brigades. The march to Cheat Mountain was difficult, and was greatly exacerbated by rainy weather. The Union defenders on Cheat Summit were very familiar with the terrain and mountain trails. Rust's advancing column encountered two Union pickets who attempted to flee. Confederate troops opened fire and killed these two, alerting the nearby pickets. Skirmishing ensued as the advancing rebels lost the element of surprise. Rust's troops then captured several more pickets who were interrogated. When they falsely exaggerated the size of the Union force at the camp, Rust believed these accounts. Two Federal probing attacks from Cheat Summit Fort were so aggressive that Rust and Anderson, each leading approximately 1500 Confederates at Cheat Mountain, were convinced that an overwhelming force confronted them. Rust decided to retreat back down the mountain without signaling the attack. At Elkwater, Reynolds's brigade faced three more Confederate brigades but refused to budge from well-prepared entrenchments.

The Confederates did not press an attack after Col. John A. Washington, a member of Lee's staff, the great-grandnephew of George Washington and the last civilian owner of the first president's Mount Vernon estate, was killed during a reconnaissance of the Union right. Reynolds was so confident in the face of such timidity that he dispatched two of his own regiments from Elk Water up the mountain road to relieve the supposedly besieged fortress garrison, but the arriving Union reinforcements were unnecessary. Lee called off the attack and, after maneuvering in the vicinity, withdrew to Valley Mountain on September 17. Reynolds, meanwhile, planned an offensive against the Confederate forces stationed at the Greenbrier River.

== Aftermath ==
Reynolds's forces lost a total of 88 casualties (10 killed, 14 wounded, and 64 captured); Confederate casualties were unreported, but Reynolds and Kimball claimed 100 Confederates were killed and twenty were captured. The battle had little effect on either the campaign or the war; both forces after the battle were in positions similar to their positions before the battle. In October, Lee left Cheat Mountain for Sewell Mountain (West Virginia) in the Kanawha River valley with the troops of John B. Floyd and Henry Wise, but he was forced to cancel the offensive operations he had planned because of low supplies and bad weather. Lee was recalled to Richmond on October 30 after achieving little in western Virginia.

== See also ==
- White Top, site of Cheat Summit Fort (Fort Milroy)
- Cheat Mountain, site of the battle
