= Sewell Mountain =

Mountain in West Virginia, United States

Coordinates: 37.9351162°N 80.8409247°W

Sewell Mountain is a summit in Fayette County, West Virginia, in the United States. With an elevation of 3,212 feet (979 m), Sewell Mountain is the 276th highest summit in the state of West Virginia.

Per Kenny (1945), Sewell Mountain was named after Stephen Sewell, a local pioneer who was killed by Native Americans in September 1776 near Jackson's River in present-day Virginia.
