= Nathan Kimball =

American politician (1822–1898)

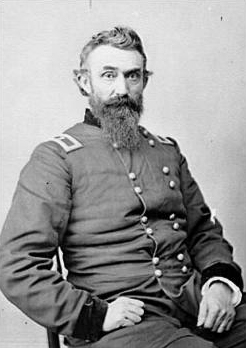

15th Treasurer of Indiana
- In office February 9, 1867 – February 9, 1871
- Governor: Conrad Baker
- Preceded by: John I. Morris
- Succeeded by: James B. Ryan

Personal details
- Born: November 22, 1822 Fredericksburg, Indiana
- Died: January 21, 1898 (aged 75) Ogden, Utah
- Party: Republican
- Other political affiliations: Whig (prior to 1854)

Military service
- Allegiance: United States of America; Union
- Branch/service: United States Army; Union Army
- Rank: Brigadier General; Brevet Major General
- Unit: 14th Indiana Infantry Regiment; Gibraltar Brigade
- Battles/wars: Mexican–American War; Battle of Buena Vista; American Civil War; Battle of Cheat Mountain; First Battle of Kernstown; Battle of Antietam; Battle of Fredericksburg; Siege of Vicksburg; Battle of Peachtree Creek; Second Battle of Franklin; Battle of Nashville

Nathan Kimball (November 22, 1822 – January 21, 1898) was a physician, politician, postmaster, and military officer, serving as a general in the Union army during the American Civil War. He was the first statewide commander of the Grand Army of the Republic veterans organization in Indiana.

== Early life and career ==
Kimball was born in Fredericksburg, Indiana, a small rural hamlet where he attended the local school. He attended the Washington County Seminary and then Indiana Asbury College (what is now DePauw University) from 1839 until 1841 before leaving to teach school and farm in Independence, Missouri. He studied medicine under his brother-in-law at the University of Louisville Medical School in 1844 and established a private practice in Salem and Livonia. He married Martha A. McPheeters in Washington County, Indiana, on September 22, 1845. The couple had one child, a son named James.

When the Mexican–American War erupted, Dr. Kimball volunteered his services to the state, raising a company from Livonia in the 2nd Indiana Infantry and being elected as a captain. Kimball was distinguished at the Battle of Buena Vista, where he rallied his company and held them fast even as the rest of the regiment crumbled and fled in disorder. He mustered out in June 1847 and returned to Indiana, where he resumed his medical practice, expanding it to Loogootee. He was defeated for election as a Whig to the Indiana State Senate in 1847. His wife died in early 1850, and he married Emily McPheeters in August. In 1852, he again lost an election, this time for Presidential Elector. Kimball joined the newly formed Republican Party in 1854. His medical practice flourished, and he became well known in the region.

== Civil War ==
With the outbreak of the Civil War in 1861, Kimball again volunteered his services to Indiana and raised a company of infantry. Governor Oliver Morton named him the colonel of the 1,143-man 14th Indiana Infantry on June 7, 1861. He led his regiment in the campaigns in western Virginia, seeing his first combat at the Battle of Cheat Mountain in the autumn.

In March 1862, he fought in the Shenandoah Valley, commanding a brigade at the Battle of Kernstown. On the second day of the fighting at Kernstown, he temporarily assumed command of the division of wounded Brigadier General James Shields, and then pushed back Stonewall Jackson in a successful counterattack. It was one of the first repulses that Jackson had suffered. In recognition of Kimball's performance, he was promoted to brigadier general on April 16, 1862. With the victory at Kernstown, Kimball had now participated in early Civil War defeats of both Robert E. Lee and Thomas J. Jackson.

In July 1862, Kimball led his regiment, the 8th Ohio Infantry, and the 7th West Virginia Infantry to join the Army of the Potomac. After adding the 4th Ohio Infantry to his brigade, Kimball was briefly stationed in Fort Monroe before covering John Pope's retreat from the Second Battle of Bull Run on September 1. During the subsequent Maryland Campaign, Kimball commanded the First Brigade of William H. French's third division in the II Corps. His men formed the right of the division during its series of assaults on the Sunken Road at the Battle of Antietam, losing over 600 men killed or wounded. Despite the severe losses, the men held their ground and eventually pushed aside the Confederates in their front, capturing 300 men and several colors. Kimball's brigade became known as the "Gibraltar Brigade" for their steadfast ability to withstand enemy fire.

In December, his men were part of the desperate assaults ordered by Ambrose Burnside against Marye's Heights during the Battle of Fredericksburg. There, Kimball suffered a painful thigh wound that put him out of action for the winter and spring of 1863. The Gibraltar Brigade was subsequently turned over to Col. Samuel S. Carroll. In early 1863, Kimball was nominated to run for the Lieutenant Governor of Indiana, but he declined the nomination to remain in the army.

After finally recovering enough for field command, Kimball was assigned to duty in the Western Theater, reporting in June 1863 to Corinth, Mississippi, where he assumed command of a division in the XVI Corps. His was one of three divisions in that corps that were ordered to Mississippi in to join the Siege of Vicksburg, although they arrived too late to participate in much of the actual fighting. In September, the greater part of Kimball's division was ordered to Arkansas, where it became incorporated in the VII Corps. He commanded the rear echelon in the Camden Expedition.

In April 1864, Kimball was relieved of duty in the Department of Arkansas and ordered to report to William T. Sherman, who became a close personal friend. Kimball was on detached duty under Sherman until May 1864, when he was given command of a brigade in the IV Corps at the beginning of the Atlanta campaign. Following the Battle of Peachtree Creek in July, Kimball assumed command of a division in the same corps.

He returned to Indiana at Governor Morton's request to help subdue the Knights of the Golden Circle in that state, then returned to active field duty in the late fall, serving as a division commander in the battles of Franklin and Nashville. He had originally been selected to stand as the Republican nominee for lieutenant governor in the 1864 gubernatorial election, but he would decline the nomination in the midst of the campaign. This was encouraged by the state Republican Party so that he could be replaced with Conrad Baker, who they believed could better appeal to recalcitrant radical German voters. He received a brevet as a major general on February 1, 1865, and mustered out of the army on August 24, 1865, following the close of the war.

== Postbellum activities ==
Kimball returned to Indiana, where he became associated with the newly organized Grand Army of the Republic, serving as its first state commander. Reentering politics, he was elected in 1867 as the State Treasurer, where he focused on banking reform and was re-elected to a second term. In 1869, he joined the Freemasons lodge in Mount Pleasant, Indiana. Kimball won election to the Indiana House of Representatives in 1873 from Marion County. His former commander in the Vicksburg Campaign, Ulysses S. Grant, appointed Kimball in 1873 as Surveyor General for the Utah Territory, a post that he held until 1878. The following year, President Rutherford B. Hayes appointed him as the Postmaster of Ogden, Utah, Kimball's adopted home. He served in this role until his death in 1898. Kimball was buried in Ogden, Utah.

== Honors ==
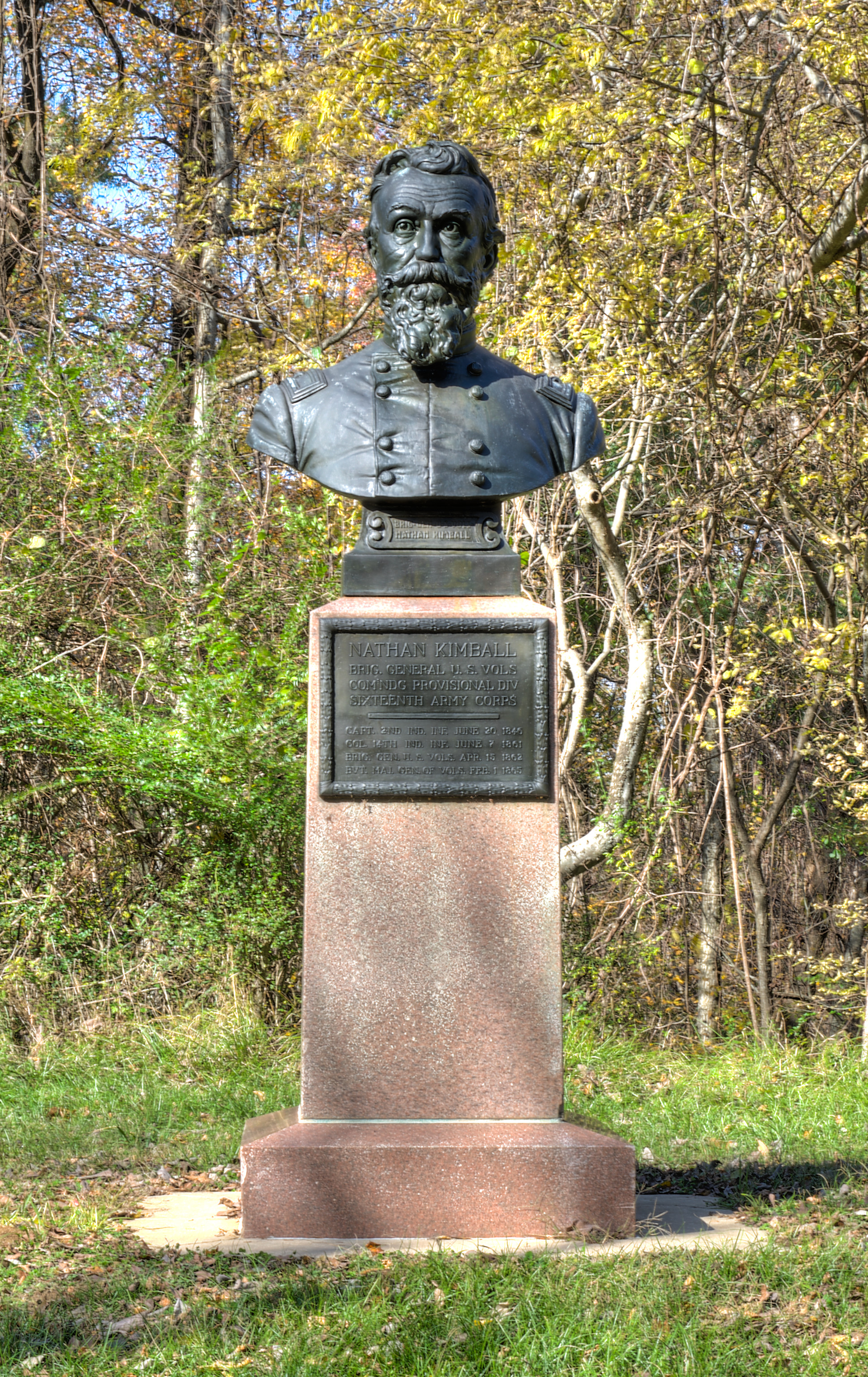
Bust of Kimball by George Brewster at Vicksburg National Military Park

A bronze bust of Kimball was erected in the Vicksburg National Military Park in 1915.

== See also ==
- List of American Civil War generals (Union)
