= First Battle of Kernstown =

1862 battle of the American Civil War

- Part of the American Civil War
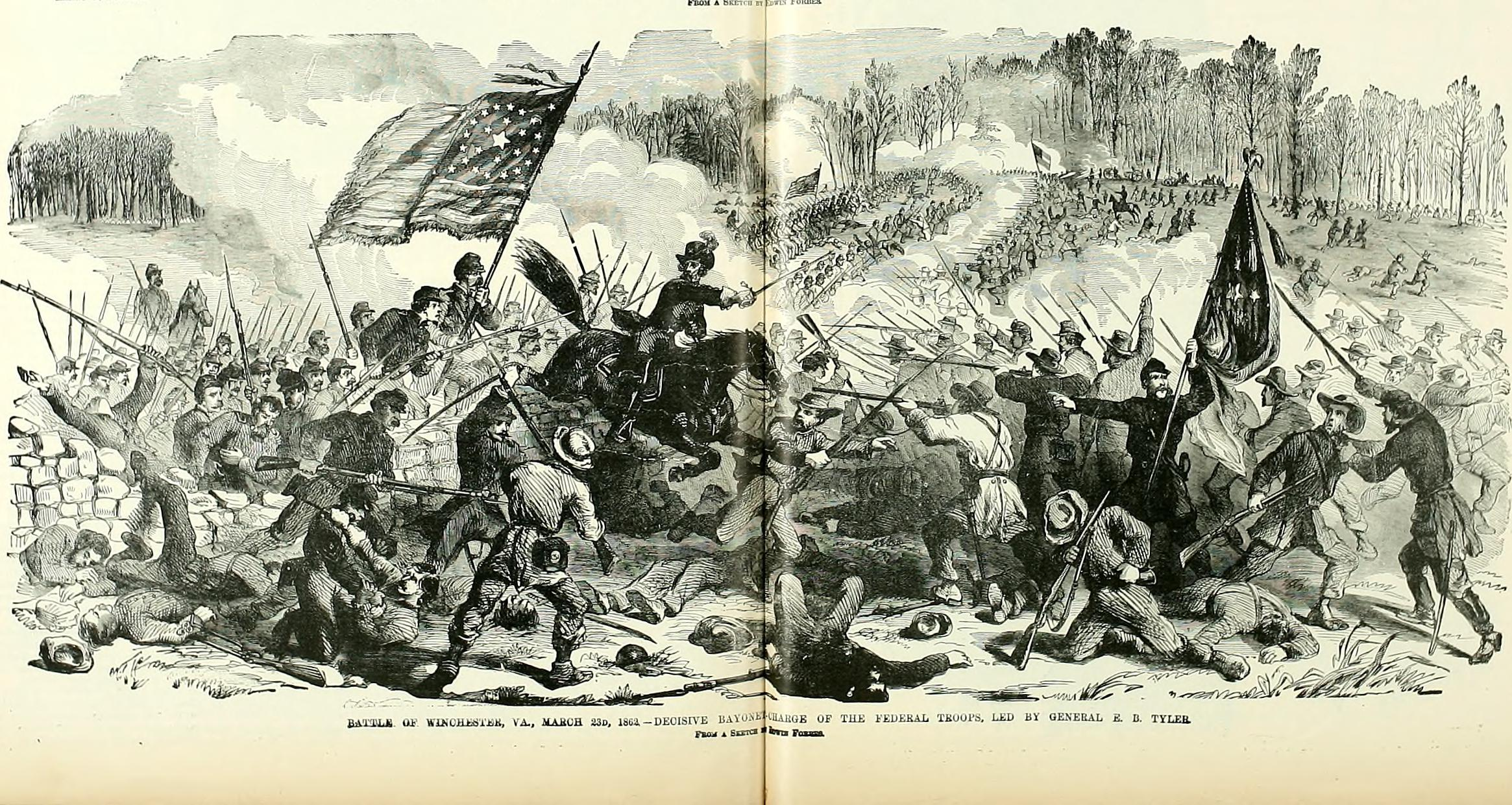
- Decisive Bayonet-Charge of the Federal Troops at Winchester, Virginia, March 23, 1862
Date	March 23, 1862
Location	Frederick County and Winchester, Virginia 39°08′42″N 78°12′00″W
Result	Union victory (See aftermath)

Belligerents
United States (Union)	(Confederate States of America) Confederate States (Confederacy)

Commanders and leaders
Nathan Kimball; Erastus B. Tyler	Stonewall Jackson; Richard B. Garnett; Turner Ashby

Strength
6,352–9,000	2,990–4,200

Casualties and losses
590 total 118 killed 450 wounded 22 captured or missing	718 total 80 killed 375 wounded 263 captured or missing

The First Battle of Kernstown was fought on March 23, 1862, in Frederick County and Winchester, Virginia, the opening battle of Confederate Maj. Gen. Thomas J. "Stonewall" Jackson's campaign through the Shenandoah Valley during the American Civil War.

Attempting to tie down the Union forces in the Valley, under the overall command of Maj. Gen. Nathaniel P. Banks, Jackson received incorrect intelligence that a small detachment under Col. Nathan Kimball was vulnerable, but it was in fact a full infantry division more than twice the size of Jackson's force. His initial cavalry attack was repelled, and he quickly reinforced it with a small infantry brigade. With his other two brigades, Jackson sought to envelop the Union right by way of Sandy Ridge. But Col. Erastus B. Tyler's brigade countered this movement, and, when Kimball's brigade moved to his assistance, the Confederates were driven from the field. There was no effective Union pursuit.

Although the battle was a Confederate tactical defeat, it represented a strategic victory for the South by preventing the Union from transferring forces from the Shenandoah Valley to reinforce the Peninsula Campaign against the Confederate capital, Richmond. Following the earlier Battle of Hoke's Run, the First Battle of Kernstown may be considered the second among Jackson's rare defeats.

== Background ==
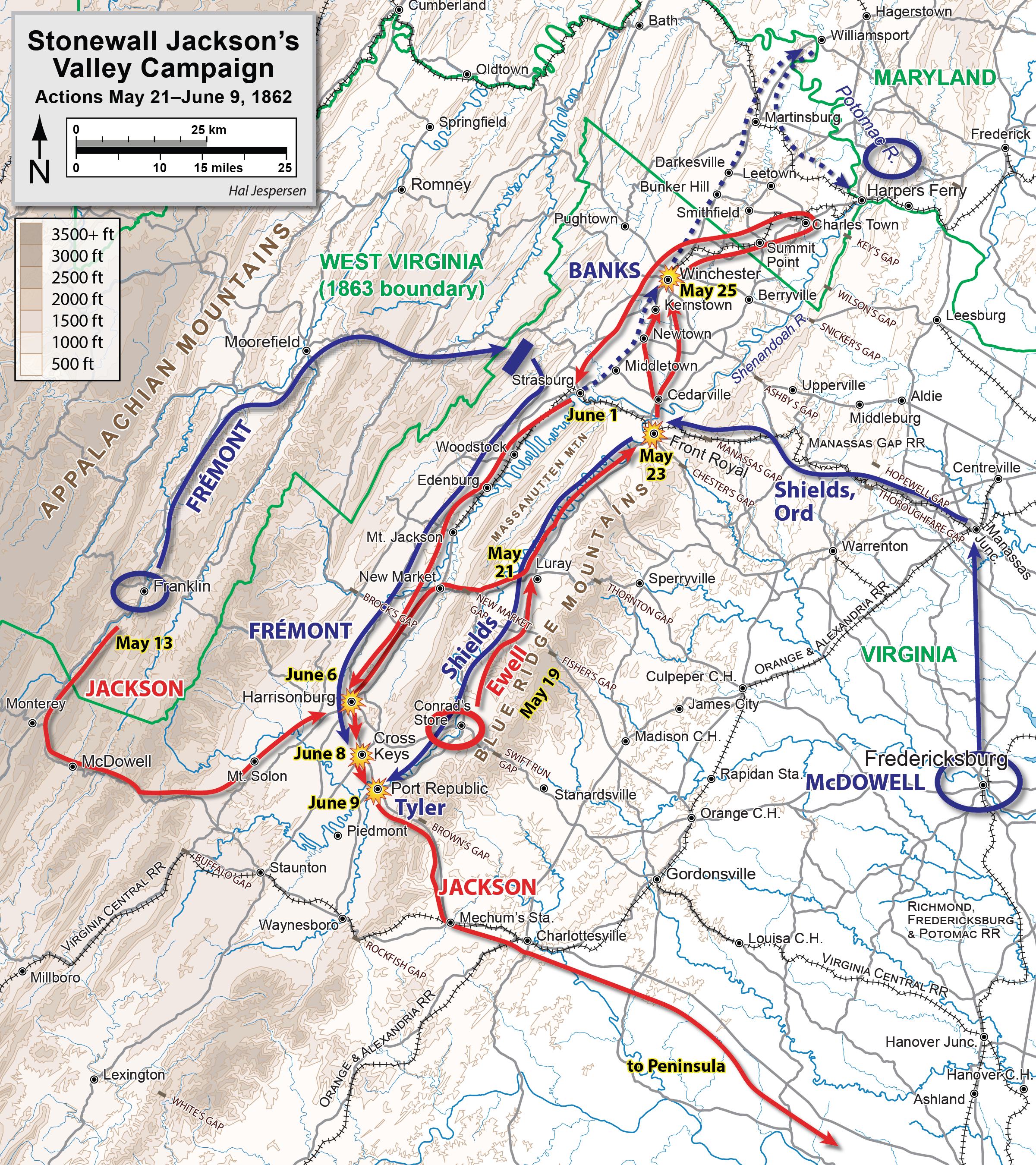
Valley Campaign: Kernstown to McDowell. Confederate Union

Jackson's division had been withdrawing "up" the Valley (to the higher elevations at the southwest end of the Valley) to cover the flank of Gen. Joseph E. Johnston's army, withdrawing from the Centreville–Manassas area to protect Richmond. Without this protective movement, the Federal army under Maj. Gen. Nathaniel P. Banks might strike at Johnston through passes in the Blue Ridge Mountains. By March 12, 1862, Banks occupied Winchester. Jackson had just withdrawn from the town and marched his forces at a leisurely pace 42 miles up the Valley Pike to Mount Jackson. On March 21, Jackson received word that Banks was splitting his force, with two divisions (under Brig. Gens. John Sedgwick and Alpheus S. Williams) returning to the immediate vicinity of Washington, D.C., freeing up other Union troops to participate in Maj. Gen. George B. McClellan's Peninsula Campaign against Richmond. The remaining division, under Brig. Gen. James Shields, was stationed at Strasburg to guard the lower (northeastern) Valley. Intelligence indicated that Shields's forces were withdrawing toward Winchester. Banks prepared to leave the Valley on March 23.

Jackson's orders from Johnston were to prevent Banks's force from leaving the Valley. Jackson turned his men around and, in one of the more grueling forced marches of the war, moved northeast 25 miles on March 22 and another 15 to Kernstown on the morning of March 23. His cavalry, under Col. Turner Ashby, skirmished with the Federals on March 22. Shields was wounded, suffering a broken arm from an artillery shell fragment. Despite his injury, Shields sent part of his division south of Winchester and one brigade marching to the north, seemingly abandoning the area. In fact he halted nearby to remain in reserve.

He turned over tactical command of his division to Col. Nathan Kimball, who ordered the Second Brigade and some of his own troops along the Valley Turnpike. Despite Shields's orders to pursue the Confederate cavalry, Kimball posted 16 guns and 800 infantrymen in a defensive position on the military crest of Prichard's Hill. Confederate loyalists in Winchester mistakenly informed Turner Ashby that Shields had left only four regiments and a few guns (about 3,000 men) and that these remaining troops had orders to march for Harpers Ferry in the morning. Ashby, who normally had a reputation as a reliable cavalry scout, did not verify these civilian reports and passed them on to Jackson. Jackson marched aggressively north with his 3,000-man division, reduced from its peak as stragglers fell out of the column, unaware that he was soon to be attacking almost 9,000 men.

== Opposing forces ==
Key: k = killed, w = wounded

=== Union ===
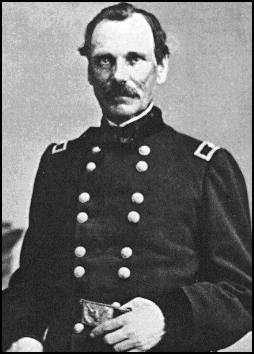
James Shields

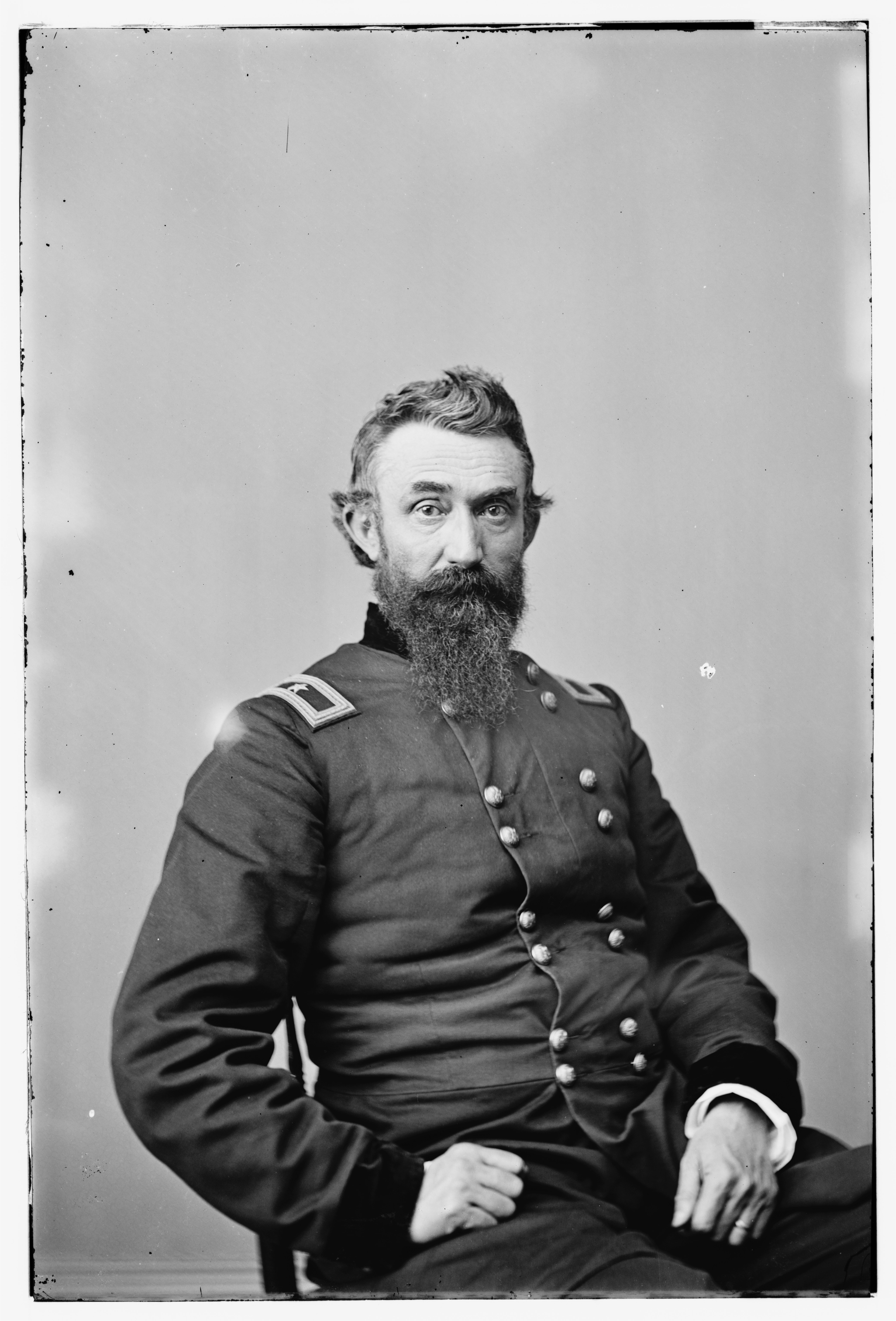
Nathan Kimball

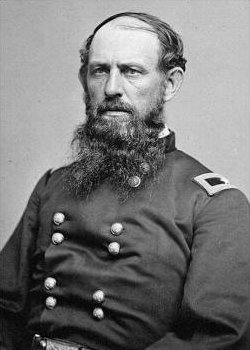
Erastus Tyler

=== Department of the Shenandoah ===
Maj. Gen. Nathaniel P. Banks (not present)

Second Division
Brig. Gen. James Shields (w March 22) (Note: Despite not being on the battlefield, Shields always maintained in later years that he was the only general ever to defeat "Stonewall" Jackson. [Martin, p. 51])
Col. Nathan Kimball (Note: As senior brigade commander, Kimball managed the Union forces on March 23 in Shields' absence. [Martin, p. 42])

First Brigade: Col. Nathan Kimball
- 14th Indiana Infantry: Lt. Col. William Harrow
- 4th Ohio Infantry: Col. John S. Mason
- 8th Ohio Infantry: Col. Samuel S. Carroll
- 67th Ohio Infantry: Lt. Col. Alvin C. Voris
- 84th Pennsylvania Infantry: Col. William Gray Murray (k)
Second Brigade: Col. Jeremiah C. Sullivan
- 5th Ohio Infantry: Lt. Col. John H. Patrick
- 39th Illinois Infantry (not engaged): Col. Thomas O. Osborn
- 13th Indiana Infantry: Lt. Col. Robert Sanford Foster
- 62nd Ohio Infantry: Col. Francis Bates Pond
Third Brigade: Col. Erastus B. Tyler
- 7th Indiana Infantry: Lt. Col. John F. Creek
- 7th Ohio Infantry: Lt. Col. William R. Creighton
- 29th Ohio Infantry: Col. Lewis P. Buckley
- 110th Pennsylvania Infantry: Col. William D. Lewis Jr.
- 1st West Virginia Infantry: Col. Joseph Thoburn
Cavalry Brigade: Col. Thornton F. Brodhead
- 1st Michigan Cavalry (battalion): Lt. Col. Joseph T. Copeland
- 1st Ohio Cavalry (Cos. A & C): Capt. Nathan D. Menken
- Ringgold (Pennsylvania) Cavalry: Capt. John Keys
- 1st West Virginia Cavalry: Maj. B. F. Chamberlain
- 1st Maryland Potomac Home Cavalry: Capt. Henry A. Cole, Capt. William Firey, and Capt. John Horner
Artillery: Lt. Col. Philip Daum
- Battery H, 1st Ohio Light Artillery: Capt. James F. Huntington
- Battery L, 1st Ohio Light Artillery: Capt. Lucius N. Robinson
- Battery E, 4th U.S. Artillery: Capt. Joseph C. Clark Jr.
- Battery "A" West Virginia Light Artillery: Capt. John Jenks
- Battery "B" West Virginia Light Artillery

=== Confederate ===
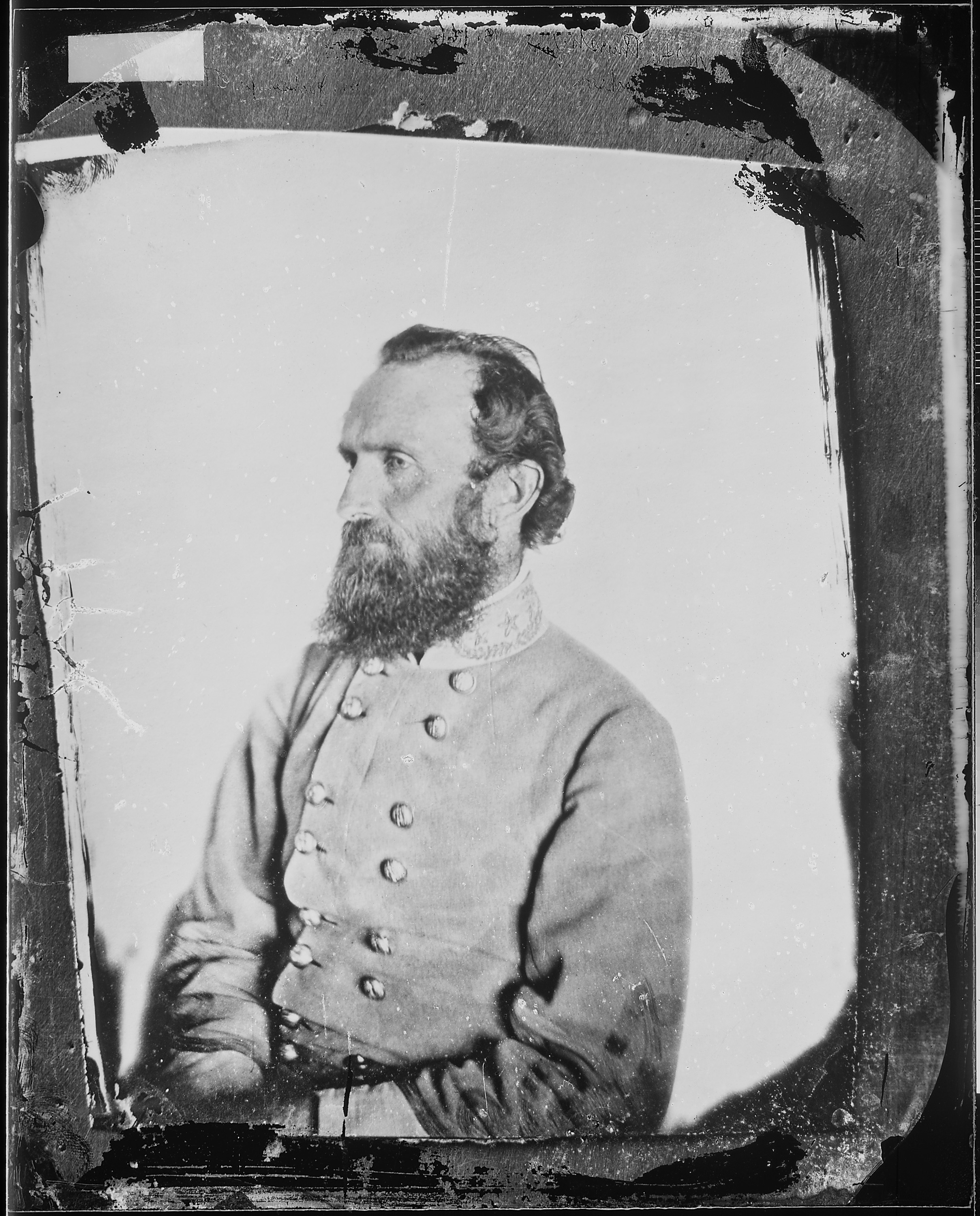
Thomas J. "Stonewall" Jackson

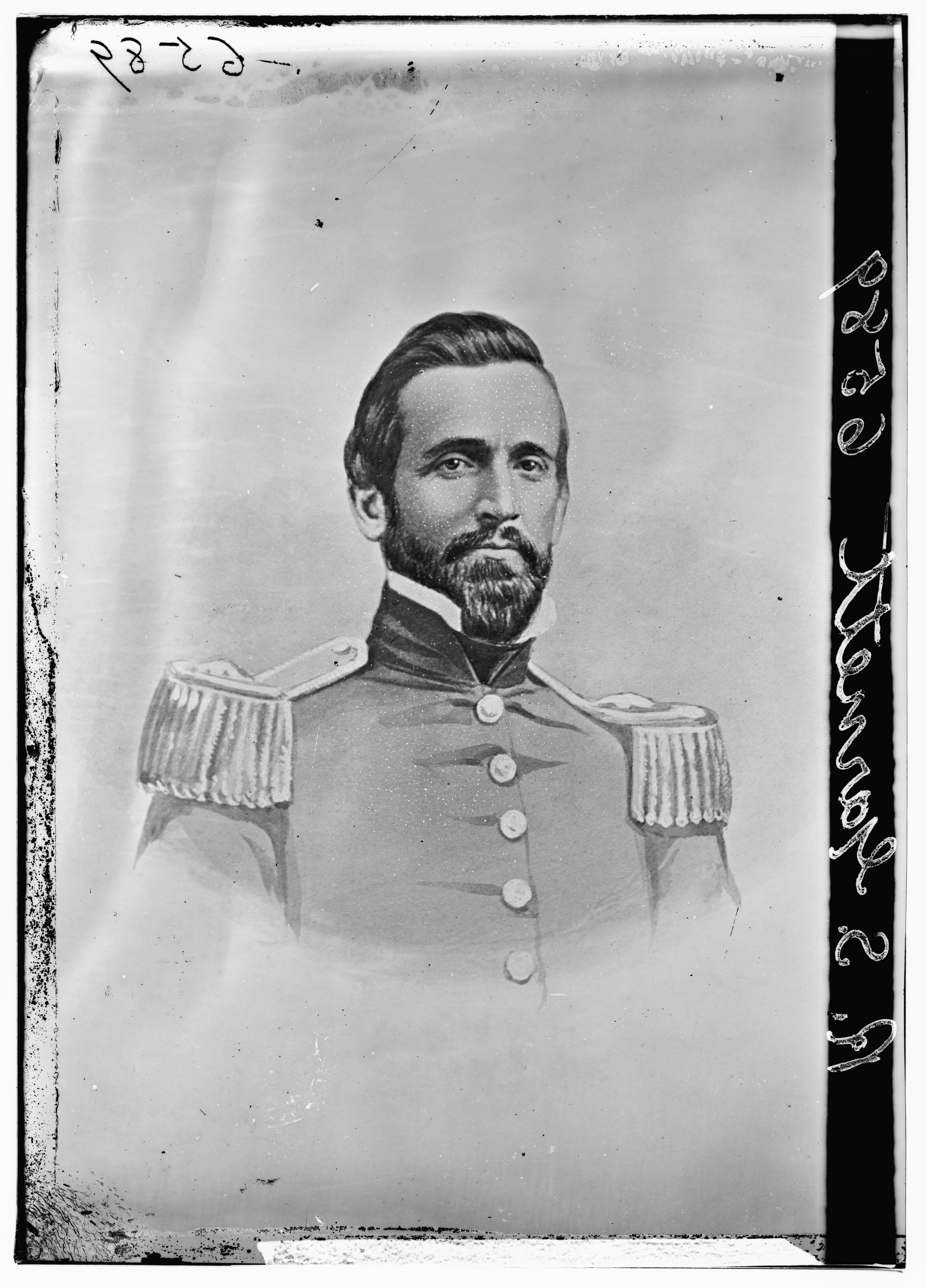
Richard B. Garnett

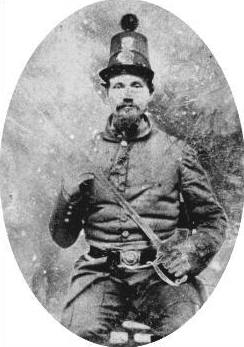
Turner Ashby

Valley District, Department of Northern Virginia
Maj. Gen. Thomas J. "Stonewall" Jackson

Jackson's Division
Maj. Gen. Thomas J. "Stonewall" Jackson

Stonewall Brigade: Brig. Gen. Richard B. Garnett (Note: Furious that Garnett had withdrawn his almost ammunitionless brigade from the line late in the day without consulting him, Jackson had Garnett arrested and court-martialed. [Martin, p. 59])
- 2nd Virginia Infantry: Col. James W. Allen
- 4th Virginia Infantry: Lt. Col. Charles A. Ronald, Maj. Albert G. Pendleton
- 5th Virginia Infantry: Col. William H. Harman
- 27th Virginia Infantry: Col. John Echols (w), Lt. Col. Andrew J. Grigsby
- 33rd Virginia Infantry: Col. Arthur C. Cummings
- Rockbridge Battery, Virginia Artillery: Capt. William McLaughlin
- West Augusta Battery, Virginia Artillery: Capt. James Waters
- Carpenter's (Virginia) Battery: Capt. Joseph Carpenter
Second (Burks') Brigade: Col. Jesse S. Burks (Note: Dissatisfied with Burks' performance, Jackson used Burks' request for sick leave to relieve him of command entirely before the next major engagement. [Martin, p. 71])
- 21st Virginia Infantry: Lt. Col. John M. Patton, Jr.
- 42nd Virginia Infantry: Lt. Col. Daniel A. Langhorne
- 48th Virginia Infantry: Col. John A. Campbell (not engaged)
- 1st Virginia Infantry Battalion (Irish): Capt. David B. Bridgford
- Hampden Virginia Artillery: Capt. Lawrence S. Marye
- Pleasant's Virginia Battery (not engaged): Lt. James Pleasants
Third (Fulkerson's) Brigade: Col. Samuel V. Fulkerson
- 23rd Virginia Infantry: Lt. Col. Alexander G. Taliaferro
- 37th Virginia Infantry: Lt. Col. Robert P. Carson
- Danville Artillery, Virginia Artillery: Lt. Albert C. Lanier
Cavalry: Col. Turner Ashby (Note: Killed approx. 2 1/2 months later at the Battle of Good's Farm near Harrisonburg. "Ashby's overconfidence and sloppy manner of field command now caught up with him." [Martin, p. 150])
- 7th Virginia Cavalry: Col. Turner Ashby
- Chew's Virginia Battery: Capt. R. Preston Chew

== Battle ==
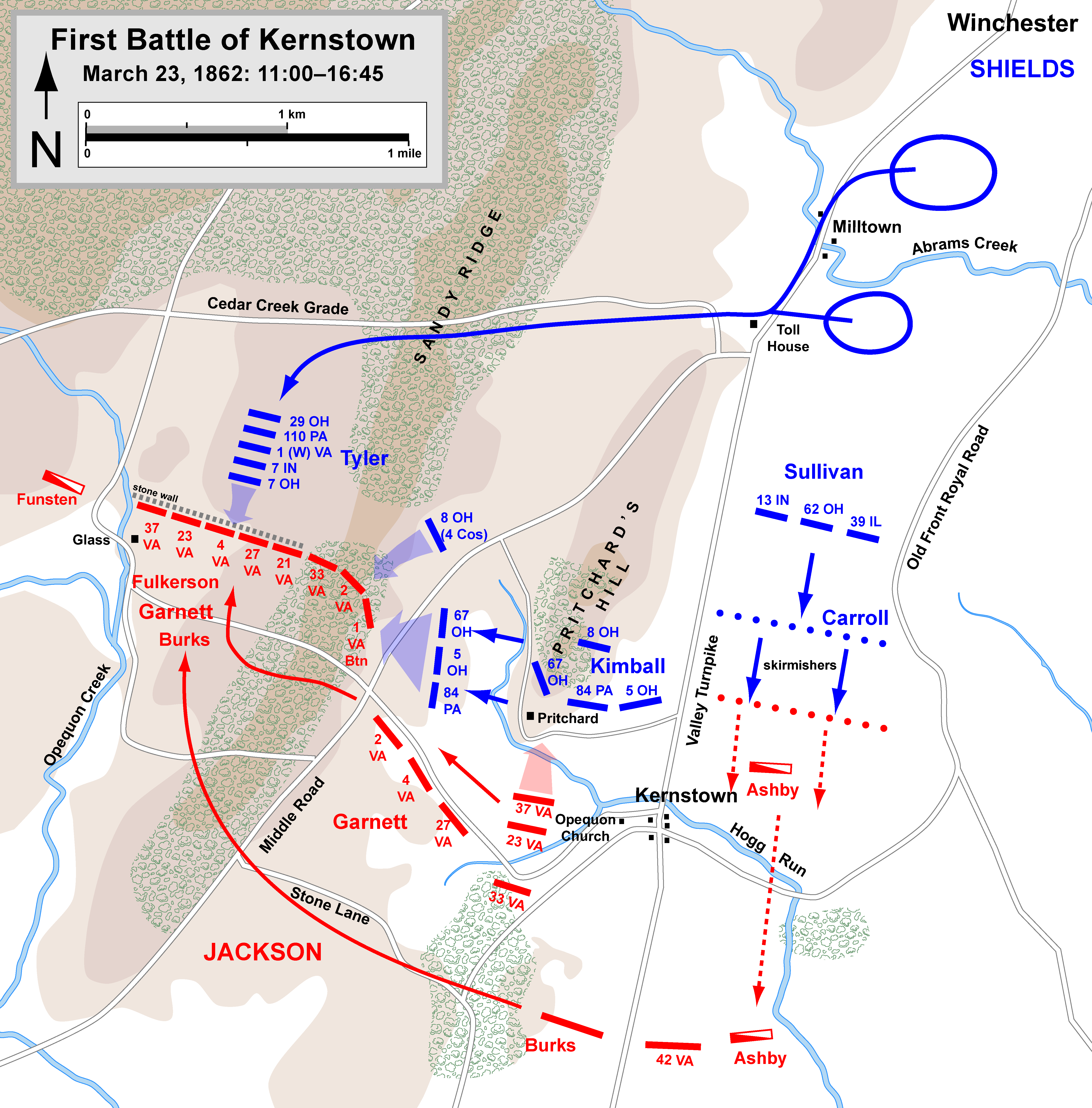
Actions at the First Battle of Kernstown, 11 a.m. to 4:45 p.m.

Jackson moved north from Woodstock and arrived before the Union position at Kernstown around 11 a.m., Sunday, March 23. The devoutly religious Jackson preferred to avoid battles on the Sabbath, but throughout his Civil War career he did not hesitate when military advantage could be gained. He later wrote to his wife:

I felt it my duty to [attack], in consideration of the ruinous effects that might result from postponing the battle until the morning. So far as I can see, my course was a wise one; the best that I could do under the circumstances, though very distasteful to my feelings; I hope and pray to our Heavenly Father that I may never again be circumstanced as on that day. I believe that so far as our troops were concerned, necessity and mercy both called for the battle. Arms is a profession that, if its principles are adhered to for success, requires an officer to do what he fears may be wrong ... if success is to be obtained.

Jackson performed no personal reconnaissance before he sent Turner Ashby on a feint against Kimball's position on the Valley Turnpike while his main force—the brigades of Col. Samuel Fulkerson and Brig. Gen. Richard B. Garnett (the Stonewall Brigade, Jackson's own first command)—attacked the Union artillery position on Pritchard Hill. The lead brigade under Fulkerson was repulsed, so Jackson decided to move around the Union right flank, about 2 miles west on Sandy Ridge, which appeared to be unoccupied. If this were successful, his men could move down the spine of the ridge and get into the Union rear, blocking their escape route to Winchester. Kimball countered the maneuver by moving his brigade under Col. Erastus B. Tyler to the west, but Fulkerson's men reached a stone wall facing a clearing on the ridge before the Union men could. Jackson's aide, Sandie Pendleton, obtained a clear view from the ridge of the Union forces arrayed against them and he estimated that there were 10,000. He reported this to Jackson, who replied, "Say nothing about it. We are in for it."

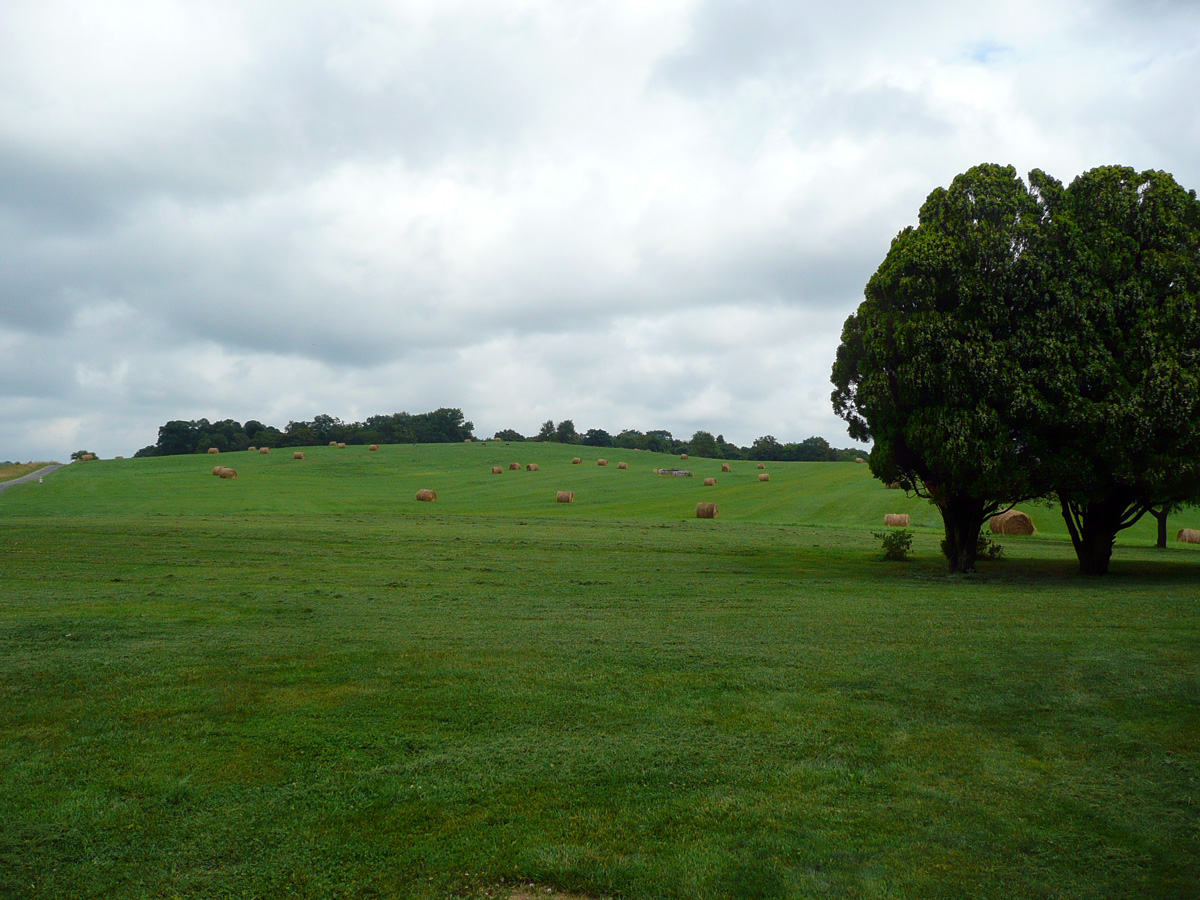
Pritchard Hill, July 2009

Around 4 p.m, Tyler attacked Fulkerson and Garnett by using an unorthodox approach with his brigade in "close column of divisions"—a brigade front of two companies with 48 companies lined up behind them in 24 lines, in all about 75 yards wide, and 400 yards long, a formation difficult to control and lacking offensive power at the front. The Confederates were temporarily able to counter this attack with their inferior numbers by firing fierce volleys from behind the stone wall. Jackson, finally realizing the strength of the force opposing him, sent out Col. Jesse Burks's brigade, which had been held in reserve, but by the time they arrived around 6 p.m., Garnett's Stonewall Brigade had run out of ammunition and he pulled them back, leaving Fulkerson's right flank exposed. Panic set in among the Confederates, and as Burks's brigade arrived, it was caught in the fleeing mob and forced to retreat. Jackson tried in vain to rally his troops. He called out to a soldier "Where are you going, man?" The soldier replied that he was out of ammunition. "Then go back and give them the bayonet!" Jackson said. However, the soldier ignored him and kept running. Kimball organized no effective pursuit. That night, a cavalryman sat with Jackson by a campfire alongside the Valley Pike and jokingly said "It was reported that they were retreating, General, but I guess they were retreating after us." Jackson, not known for his sense of humor, replied, "I think I am satisfied, sir."

== Aftermath ==
Union casualties were 590 (118 killed, 450 wounded, 22 captured or missing), Confederate 718 (80 killed, 375 wounded, 263 captured or missing).

Despite the Union victory, President Abraham Lincoln was disturbed by Jackson's audacity and his potential threat to Washington. He sent Banks back to the Valley along with Alpheus Williams's division. He also was concerned that Jackson might move into western Virginia against Maj. Gen. John C. Frémont, so he ordered that the division of Brig. Gen. Louis Blenker be detached from McClellan's Army of the Potomac and sent to reinforce Frémont. Lincoln also took this opportunity to re-examine Maj. Gen. George B. McClellan's plans for the defenses of Washington while the Peninsula Campaign was underway and decided that the forces were insufficient. He eventually ordered that the corps of Maj. Gen. Irvin McDowell, which was moving south against Richmond in support of McClellan, remain in the vicinity of the capital. McClellan claimed that the loss of these forces prevented him from taking Richmond during his campaign. The strategic realignment of Union forces caused by Jackson's battle at Kernstown—the only battle he lost in his military career—turned out to be a strategic victory for the Confederacy. The remainder of Jackson's Valley Campaign consisted of lightning movements and five victories against superior forces organized into three Union armies, which elevated him to the position of the most famous general in the Confederacy (until this reputation was later supplanted by his superior, Gen. Robert E. Lee).

Seldom during the Civil War was a general officer as gallant and as capable as Garnett treated so unjustly.... By any objective standard, Garnett had done the best at Kernstown that could reasonably have been expected under the circumstances as they existed. Ignorant of Jackson's tactical blueprint, his brigade out of ammunition and outflanked, Garnett took the only sane course of action. In doing so he saved the Valley army.

— Peter Cozzens, Shenandoah 1862

Jackson refused to accept any responsibility for the defeat and subsequently arrested the commander of his old Stonewall Brigade, Brig. Gen. Richard B. Garnett, for retreating from the battlefield before permission was received. The Stonewall Brigade's withdrawal, which came after it received the bulk of the Union fire and suffered the majority of Confederate casualties, uncovered the right of Fulkerson's Brigade, forcing it to also withdraw and starting a panic. He was replaced by Brig. Gen. Charles S. Winder. During the invasion of Maryland in September, Robert E. Lee ordered the charges against him dropped, but Garnett suffered from the humiliation of his court-martial for over a year, until he was killed at Gettysburg during Pickett's Charge.

A Second Battle of Kernstown occurred in the Valley Campaigns of 1864.

== Battlefield preservation ==
The Civil War Trust (a division of the American Battlefield Trust) and its partners have acquired and preserved 388 acres (1.57 km^{2}) of the First Kernstown battlefield. The Kernstown Battlefield Association owns and operates the Kernstown battlefields on the 1854 Pritchard-Grim Farm three miles southwest of Winchester, Va. The park has walking trails, a small museum and a visitor center inside the farmhouse. A portion of the battle area was listed on the National Register of Historic Places in 2024.

== Bibliography ==
- Banks, Raymond H. (2025). General Nathaniel Prentice Banks: The War Years (Kernstown section). Orlando: R.H. Banks. p. 778. ISBN 979-8-218-83208-7.
- Clark, Champ (1984). Decoying the Yanks: Jackson's Valley Campaign. Alexandria, Virginia: Time-Life Books. ISBN 0-8094-4724-X.
- Cozzens, Peter (2008). Shenandoah 1862: Stonewall Jackson's Valley Campaign. Chapel Hill: University of North Carolina Press. ISBN 978-0-8078-3200-4.
- Eicher, John H.; David J. Eicher (2001). Civil War High Commands. Stanford, California: Stanford University Press. ISBN 0-8047-3641-3.
- Freeman, Douglas S. (1946). Lee's Lieutenants: A Study in Command. Vol. 3 vols. New York: Scribner. ISBN 0-684-85979-3.
- Kennedy, Frances H., ed. (1998). The Civil War Battlefield Guide (2nd ed.). Boston: Houghton Mifflin Co. ISBN 0-395-74012-6.
- Martin, David G. (1994). Jackson's Valley Campaign: November 1861 – June 1862 (Revised ed.). Philadelphia: Combined Books. ISBN 0-938289-40-3.
- Robertson, James I. Jr. (1997). Stonewall Jackson: The Man, The Soldier, The Legend. New York: MacMillan. ISBN 0-02-864685-1.
- Salmon, John S. (2001). The Official Virginia Civil War Battlefield Guide. Mechanicsburg, Pennsylvania: Stackpole Books. ISBN 0-8117-2868-4.
- Tanner, Robert G. (1976). Stonewall in the Valley: Thomas J. "Stonewall" Jackson's Shenandoah Valley Campaign Spring 1862. Garden City, New York: Doubleday & Company. ISBN 0-385-12148-2.
- Walsh, George (2002). Damage Them All You Can: Robert E. Lee's Army of Northern Virginia. New York: Forge. ISBN 978-0-312-87445-2.
