= Samuel S. Carroll =

Union Army officer in the American Civil War

Samuel Sprigg Carroll
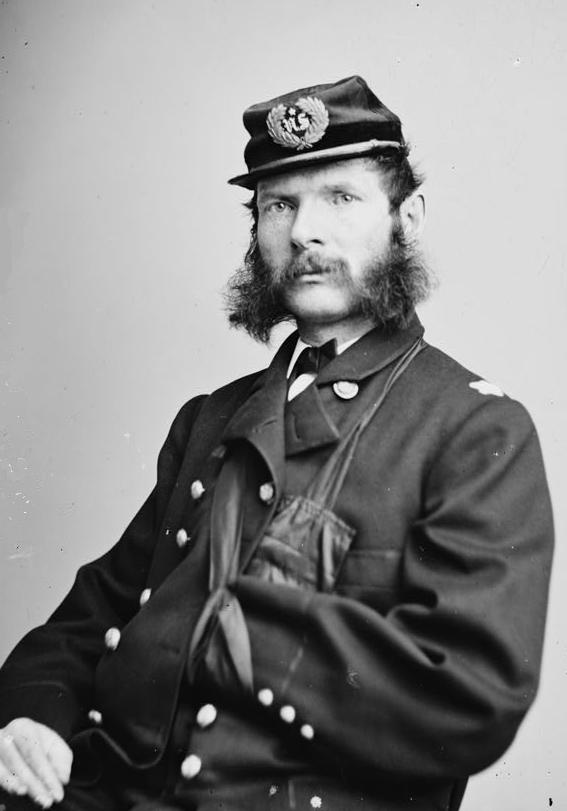
- Samuel S. Carroll
- Born: September 21, 1832; Takoma Park, Maryland
- Died: January 28, 1893 (aged 60) near Takoma Park, Maryland
- Burial place: Oak Hill Cemetery (Washington, D.C.)
- Military career
- Allegiance: United States; Union
- Branch: United States Army; Union Army
- Service years: 1856–1869
- Rank: Brigadier General; Brevet Major General
- Nickname: "Red"
- Commands: 8th Ohio Infantry; Gibraltar Brigade
- Conflicts: American Civil War

Samuel Sprigg "Red" Carroll (September 21, 1832 – January 28, 1893) was a career officer in the United States Army who rose to the rank of brigadier general of the Union during the American Civil War. The Maryland native was most known for his service as the commander of the famed "Gibraltar Brigade", an infantry brigade in the Army of the Potomac that played a key role in the defense of Cemetery Hill during the Battle of Gettysburg, as well as in repulsing a portion of Pickett's Charge.

== Early life ==
Samuel S. Carroll was born near what is now Takoma Park, Maryland. He was a grandson of Charles Carroll of Bellevue (1767–1823) (a cousin of Charles Carroll, a signer of the Declaration of Independence). He was educated in the local schools, and graduated from College of Saint James (Saint James School), Maryland, and received an appointment to the United States Military Academy in West Point, New York. He graduated 44th of 49 cadets in the Class of 1856 and was brevetted as a second lieutenant in the infantry. He was assigned to frontier duty at a variety of posts in the Old West before returning to West Point as the post's quartermaster.

He was married to Miss Helen Bennett in St. Louis, Missouri, on September 3, 1856. Helen was the eldest child of William Bennett, a prominent merchant born in Maryland, and his wife Catherine DuBois. They had three known children.

== Civil War ==
Carroll was promoted to the rank of captain in the 10th U.S. Infantry shortly after the Civil War erupted. In December 1861, he was appointed as colonel of the 8th Ohio Infantry, a three-years' regiment that exclusively saw duty in the Eastern Theater. During the 1862 Valley Campaign, Carroll commanded the 4th Brigade in James Shields' division. Carroll commanded the vanguard of the Union army at the Battle of Cross Keys. He was commended for his performance at the Battle of Cedar Mountain. Transferred with this brigade to the Northern Virginia area, he was severely wounded in the chest in a fight near the Rapidan River. He recovered in time to resume his field command in III Corps before the Battle of Fredericksburg.

In 1863, Carroll commanded the 1st Brigade, 3rd Division of the II Corps at the Battle of Chancellorsville. During the second day at Gettysburg, his 8th Ohio was involved in skirmishing along the Emmitsburg Road, while the other three regiments of the Gibraltar Brigade, 14th Indiana, Col. John Coons (191) 4th Ohio, Lieut. Col. Leonard W. Carpenter (299)and 7th West Virginia, Lieut. Col. Jonathan H. Lockwood counter-attacked oncoming Confederates from North Carolina and the Louisiana Tigers from Jubal Early's division on the slopes of Cemetery Hill, driving them back in the growing darkness. Carroll later led his depleted brigade in some small engagements during the Mine Run Campaign.

Carroll was promoted to brigadier general on May 12, 1864. He was twice wounded during the Overland Campaign, once at the Wilderness and again at Spotsylvania Court House. After his recovery, he commanded the Department of West Virginia briefly and later led a division in the Army of the Shenandoah.

== Post-war career ==
When the war ended, Carroll stayed in the postbellum Regular Army, serving in the inspector general's department. He continued to be affected by his war-time injuries and retired from the army in 1869 with the brevet rank of major general. In August 1886, his wife divorced him.

== Death and legacy ==
In late January 1893, Carroll contracted pneumonia and died six days later at the age of 60 at his country residence, "Belleview", near Takoma Park, Maryland. His death was hastened by his never having fully recovered from his wounds. His funeral was held in St. John's Church in Washington, D.C. He was buried with full military honors in Oak Hill Cemetery in Georgetown, Washington, D.C.

In 1861, Fort Carroll (a.k.a. Battery Carroll), on the edge of Congress Heights in DC was named for him.

The main street in Takoma Park is named Carroll Avenue in his memory.

== See also ==
- List of American Civil War generals (Union)
- Carroll family
