= Albert Sereno Hall =

American Civil War commander (1830– 1863)

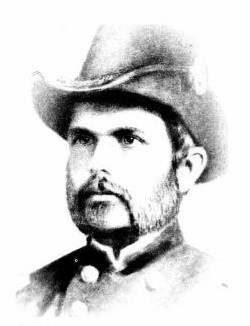
- Albert Sereno Hall
- Born: 1830; Charlestown Township, Portage County, Ohio, U.S.
- Died: 10 July 1863 (aged 32–33) Murfreesboro, Tennessee, U.S.
- Branch: Union Army
- Service years: 1861–1863
- Rank: Colonel
- Commands: 105th Ohio Infantry Regiment
- Conflicts: American Civil War; Battle of Cheat Mountain (1861); Battle of Shiloh (1862); Battle of Perryville (1862); Battle of Vaught's Hill (1863)

Albert Sereno Hall (1830 – 10 July 1863) led a regiment and a brigade in the Union Army during the American Civil War. He joined the 24th Ohio Infantry Regiment and soon became a company commander. He led his company at the Battle of Cheat Mountain in 1861. He fought at the Battle of Shiloh in April 1862, was seriously wounded, and was promoted lieutenant colonel for gallantry. When the 105th Ohio Infantry Regiment was formed, Hall was appointed colonel commander. He led the 105th Ohio at the Battle of Perryville in October 1862. When the brigade commander was killed, Hall assumed command of the brigade. While leading his brigade on a reconnaissance in March 1863, he repulsed a Confederate cavalry force led by John Hunt Morgan at the Battle of Vaught's Hill. Hall died of typhoid fever in July 1863 at Murfreesboro, Tennessee.

== Early life ==
In 1830, Albert Sereno Hall was born in Charlestown Township, Portage County, Ohio. His grandfather had been one of the first European settlers in the area. He was educated in Chester, Ohio, and taught school. In 1853, he became a lawyer and moved to Jefferson, Ohio where he became prosecuting attorney. In 1859, he briefly moved to Minneapolis, Minnesota, before settling in Warren, Ohio. In June 1861, Hall was mustered in as captain of F Company 24th Ohio Infantry Regiment. The regiment took part in operations related to the Battle of Cheat Mountain in September. Hall was promoted major on 20 December 1861.

== Major battles ==
Hall fought at the Battle of Shiloh on 7 March 1862 as the major of the 24th Ohio Infantry Regiment. The regiment was part of Don Carlos Buell's Army of the Ohio, William "Bull" Nelson's 4th Division, Jacob Ammen's 10th Brigade. Ammen's brigade also included the 36th Indiana and 6th Ohio Infantry Regiments. Ammen's brigade formed the left flank of Nelson's division as it advanced. At 10:00 am, Nelson's troops confronted a Confederate brigade which it drove back. After Nelson's men encountered Confederate artillery, Buell sent two batteries forward in support. Ammen detached the 6th Ohio to guard William R. Terrill's battery and deployed the 24th Ohio and 36th Indiana in the front line. Ammen's brigade continued to advance against tough Confederate resistance, including an attack on its left flank. During this phase of the battle, Hall was wounded and the 24th Ohio suffered many casualties. His wound was two inches above the eyebrow. He was promoted lieutenant colonel in the 24th Ohio. On 12 June 1862, he was appointed colonel of the newly recruited 105th Ohio Infantry Regiment.

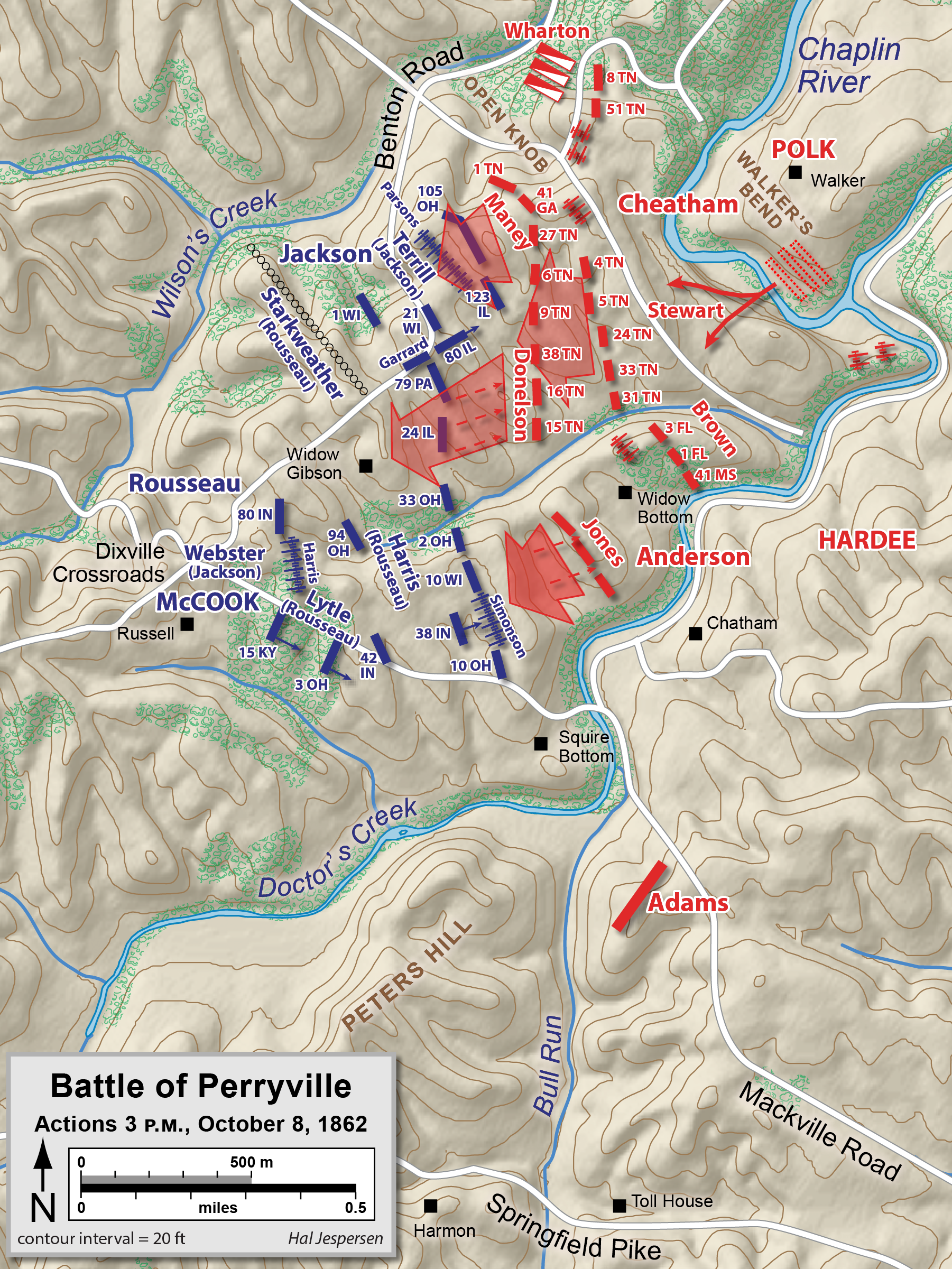
Battle of Perryville at 3 pm. The 105th Ohio is the northernmost Union unit.

At the Battle of Perryville on 8 October 1862, Hall's 105th Ohio was in the worst of the fighting. The regiment was assigned to Alexander McDowell McCook's I Corps, James S. Jackson's 10th Division, and Terrill's 33rd Brigade. The 105th Ohio went into the battle with 645 soldiers and lost 50 killed, 147 wounded, and 6 missing, or 31.5% casualties. The 10th division was entirely composed of newly recruited soldiers, and the men disliked Jackson because of his tyrannical nature. Terrill was promoted after distinguishing himself at Shiloh. At around 1:30 pm, McCook ordered the 105th Ohio, 123rd Illinois, and a provisional artillery battery forward to defend a hill known as the Open Knob. After the battery was overrun, Terrill ordered the 105th Ohio to retreat 60 yd (55 m). After then withdrawing into a cornfield, the regiment ended the day guarding an artillery battery. Jackson, Terrill, and the other brigade commander George P. Webster were all killed or mortally wounded at Perryville. Terrill was fatally hit by a fragment from an artillery shell while standing near Hall. After Terrill fell, Hall succeeded to the command of the 33rd Brigade. Hall temporarily commanded the 10th Division when he made his report on 10 October.

Hall missed the Battle of Stones River from 31 December 1862 to 2 January 1863. His brigade was in George Henry Thomas' Center Corps, 5th Division led by Joseph J. Reynolds. Hall's brigade consisted of the 80th Illinois, 123rd Illinois, 101st Indiana, and 105th Ohio Infantry Regiments. During the battle, Reynolds' 5th Division was located along the Louisville and Nashville Railroad near Gallatin, Tennessee. Reynolds was operating against John Hunt Morgan's Confederate cavalry.

== Vaught's Hill ==
On 18 March 1863, Hall's infantry brigade began a reconnaissance from Murfreesboro, Tennessee. The brigade marched northeast of Murfreesboro to Cainsville where it captured two Confederates and camped for the night. The brigade consisted of the following units.

Union infantry order of battle for the Battle of Vaught's Hill
Unit	Officers	Men	Commander
80th Illinois Infantry	18	365	Colonel Thomas G. Allen
123rd Illinois Infantry	18	313	Colonel James Monroe
101st Indiana Infantry	19	353	Lieut. Colonel Thomas Doan
105th Ohio Infantry	18	245	Lieut. Colonel William R. Tolles
19th Indiana Battery	-	-	Captain S. J. Harris (1 section)
Stokes' Cavalry, Company A	-	-	Captain Joseph H. Blackburn

On the morning of 19 March, Hall's brigade marched west to Statesville where it skirmished with 150–200 Confederate cavalry, killing one and capturing two. From Statesville, the Union brigade moved southeast to Prosperity Church where it remained for two hours. Prosperity Church is on the main road from Murfreesboro to Liberty (now State Highway 96). Seeing a Confederate battleline to the east, across the road to Liberty, Hall believed that he was about to be attacked. He withdrew the brigade west and camped for the night on the west side of Auburntown. That evening, there were Confederate pickets on all the roads leading to Hall's position.

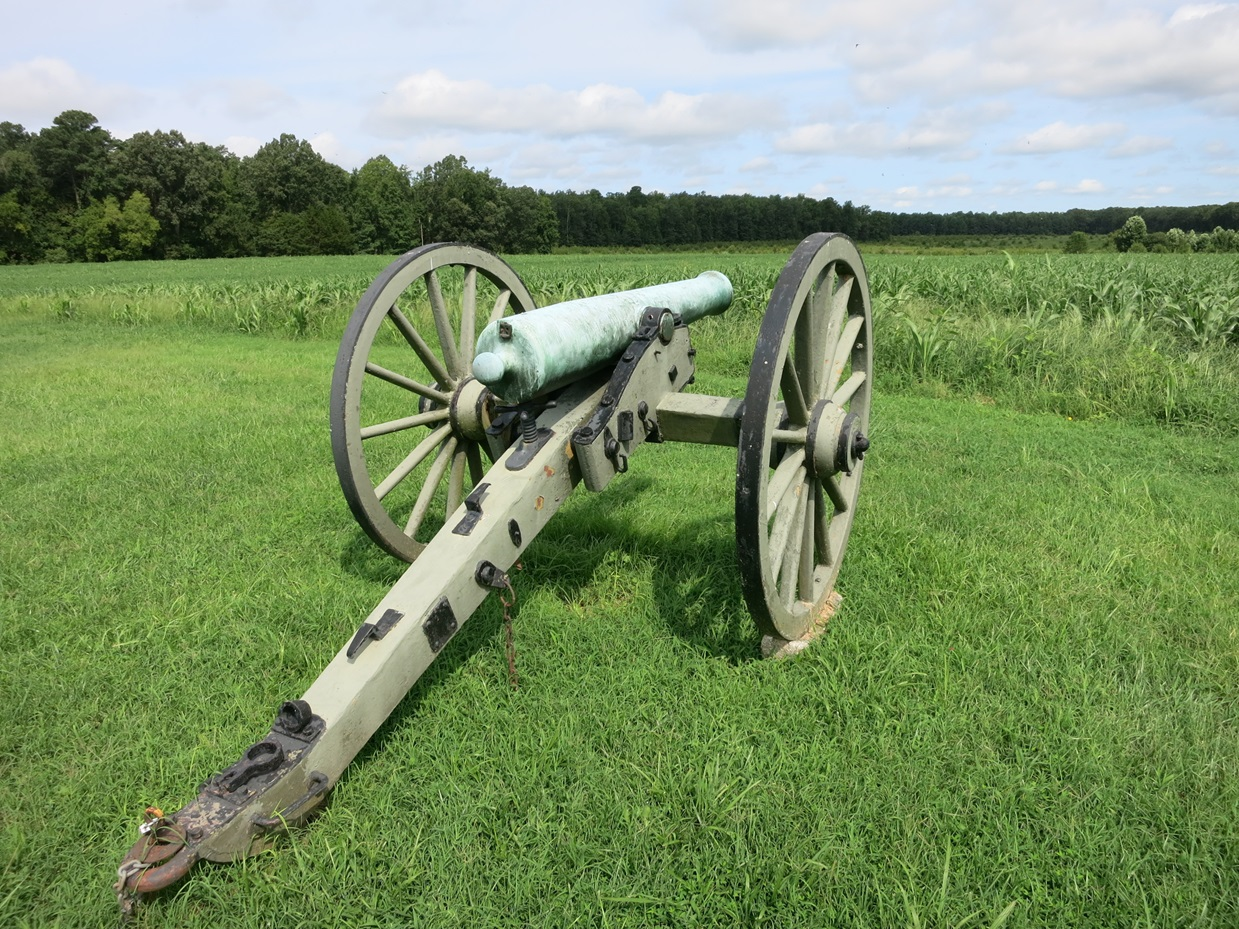
M1857 12-pounder Napoleon

On the morning of 20 March, Hall's brigade marched west to Milton, pausing on the way to fill canteens. Near Milton, Hall posted the brigade on a hill with 101st Indiana on the left and 80th Illinois on the right. Thinking he was outnumbered, Hall sent messengers to J. J. Reynolds asking for help. The Confederates sent two bodies of cavalry around each flank. The Confederates to the left (north) were mostly out of range, but those to the right (south) passed within range and suffered losses from one of Hall's two 12-pounder Napoleon cannons and rifle fire. The Confederates to the north dismounted and launched an attack on the 101st Indiana and 123rd Illinois which was repelled. A second assault from the north caused some confusion, but after half of the 80th Illinois and a cannon arrived from the right flank, the attack was driven off. An attack on the rear was repulsed by the 105th Ohio.

The Union brigade's defensive perimeter covered approximately 5 acres (2.0 ha). The position was taken under fire from four Confederate artillery pieces. After a fight lasting from 11:30 am to 2:15 pm, the Confederates pulled back out of rifle range, but they continued to bombard Hall's brigade with artillery until 4:30 pm. The 4th Michigan Cavalry Regiment arrived as a reinforcement at 7:00 pm, followed 30 minutes later by Colonel Henry A. Hambright's infantry brigade. Hall's brigade reported losses of 1 officer and 5 enlisted men killed, 1 officer and 41 enlisted men wounded, and 8 enlisted men missing. The Confederates, who were commanded by John Hunt Morgan, left behind 63 dead and wounded men and 10 prisoners. Hall submitted his report on 22 March.

Hall came down with typhoid fever on 20 June and died at Murfreesboro on 10 July 1863. His son Charles L. Hall was a judge in the District Court of Nebraska in 1896.
