= 24th Ohio Infantry Regiment =

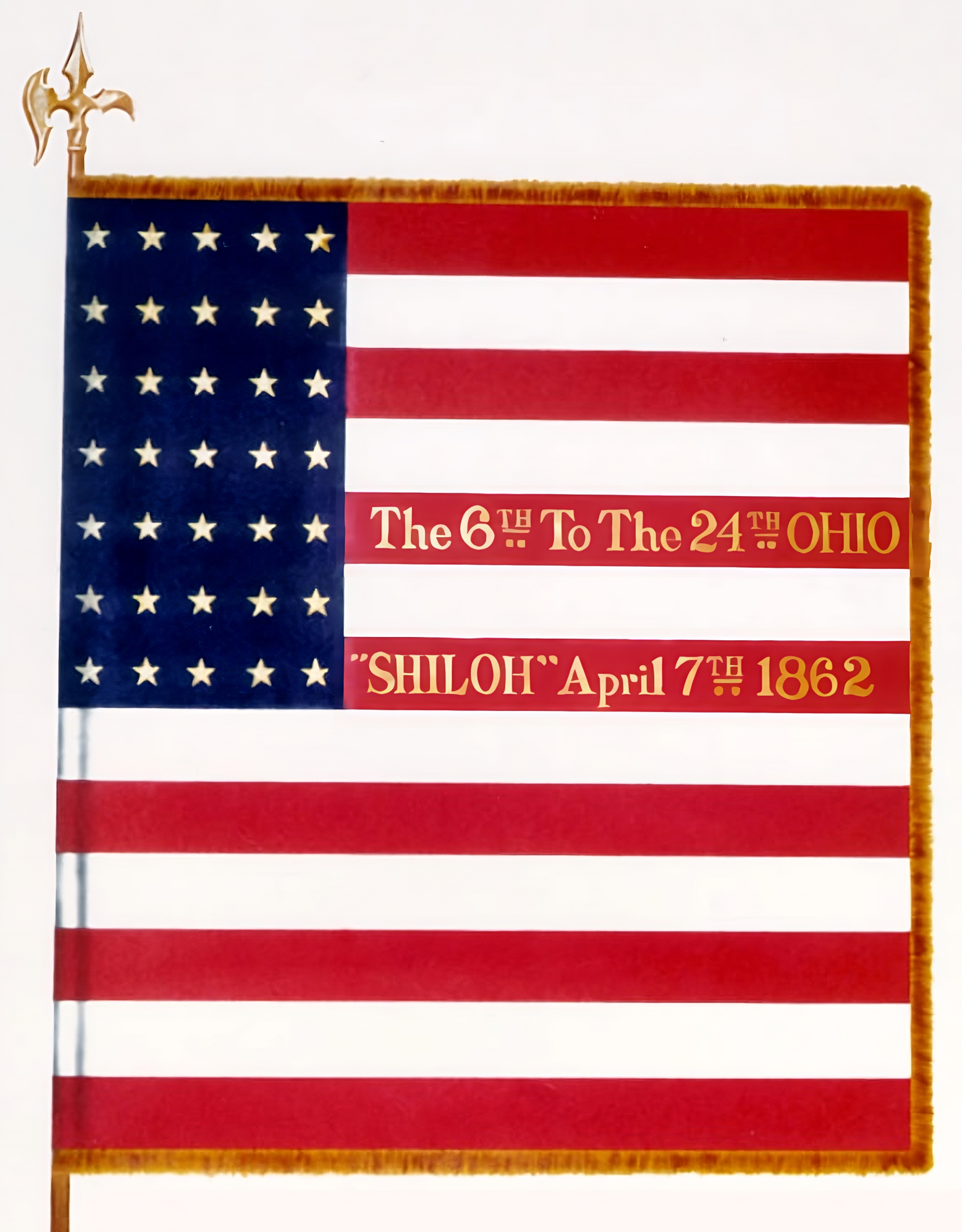
- 24th Ohio National Colors
- Active: May 29, 1861, to June 24, 1864 (Co. D to October 22, 1865)
- Country: United States
- Allegiance: Union
- Branch: Union Army
- Type: Infantry
- Size: Avg. ~476
- Nicknames: "Ammen's Regulars"; "The Methodists"; "The Cleveland Garribaldians"; "The Orphan Regiment"; "The Red Shirts"
- Mottos: "Outnumbered we may be, but surprised, never!"
- Equipment: Model 1816 Musket; Springfield Model 1855; Springfield Model 1861; Waxed jacket; Slouch hat
- Engagements: Battle of Cheat Mountain; >Capture and Occupation of Nashville<; Battle of Shiloh; Siege and Occupation of Corinth; Buell's Campaign in North Alabama and Middle Tennessee; Pursuit of Bragg to Loudon; Battle of Perryville; Affair at Nelson's Cross Roads; Skirmish at Lee and Gordon's Mill; Battle of Stones River; Battle at Woodbury; Tullahoma Campaign; Battle of Chickamauga; Siege of Chattanooga; Battle of Lookout Mountain; Battle of Missionary Ridge; Battle of Ringgold Gap; Demonstration on Dalton; Forrest's Expedition Into West Tennessee and Kentucky; Battle of Rocky Face Ridge

Insignia
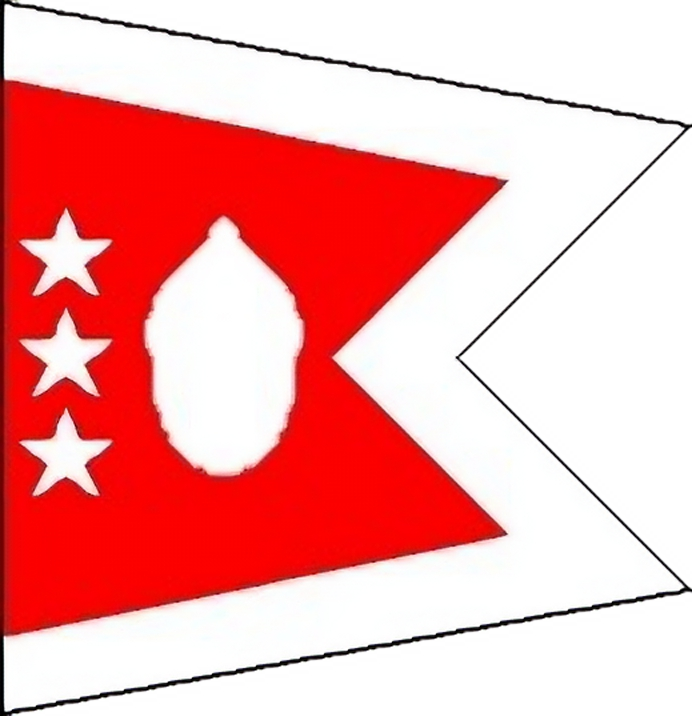
- November 1862 to January 1863, 3rd Brigade, 2nd Division XIV Corps, Army of the Cumberland

The 24th Ohio Infantry Regiment was an infantry regiment in the Union Army during the American Civil War. In the Battle of Cheat Mountain, the 24th Ohio and 14th Indiana, with around 300 engaged, defended Cheat Summit Fort—also called Fort Milroy—from around 4,500 Confederates of Anderson, Rust, and Gen. H. R. Jackson's brigades, leading to a shameful defeat for Confederate General Robert E. Lee. The regiment played "The Star-Spangled Banner" while marching out of Pittsburg Landing and almost lost all of its commissioned officers in the Battle of Stones River. The 24th Ohio is supposed to have suffered its only defeat on the battlefield at the Battle of Chickamauga.

== The Battle Before Cheat Mountain Summit ==
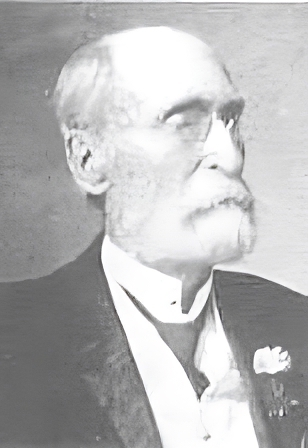
Post-War photo of Col. David J. Higgins.

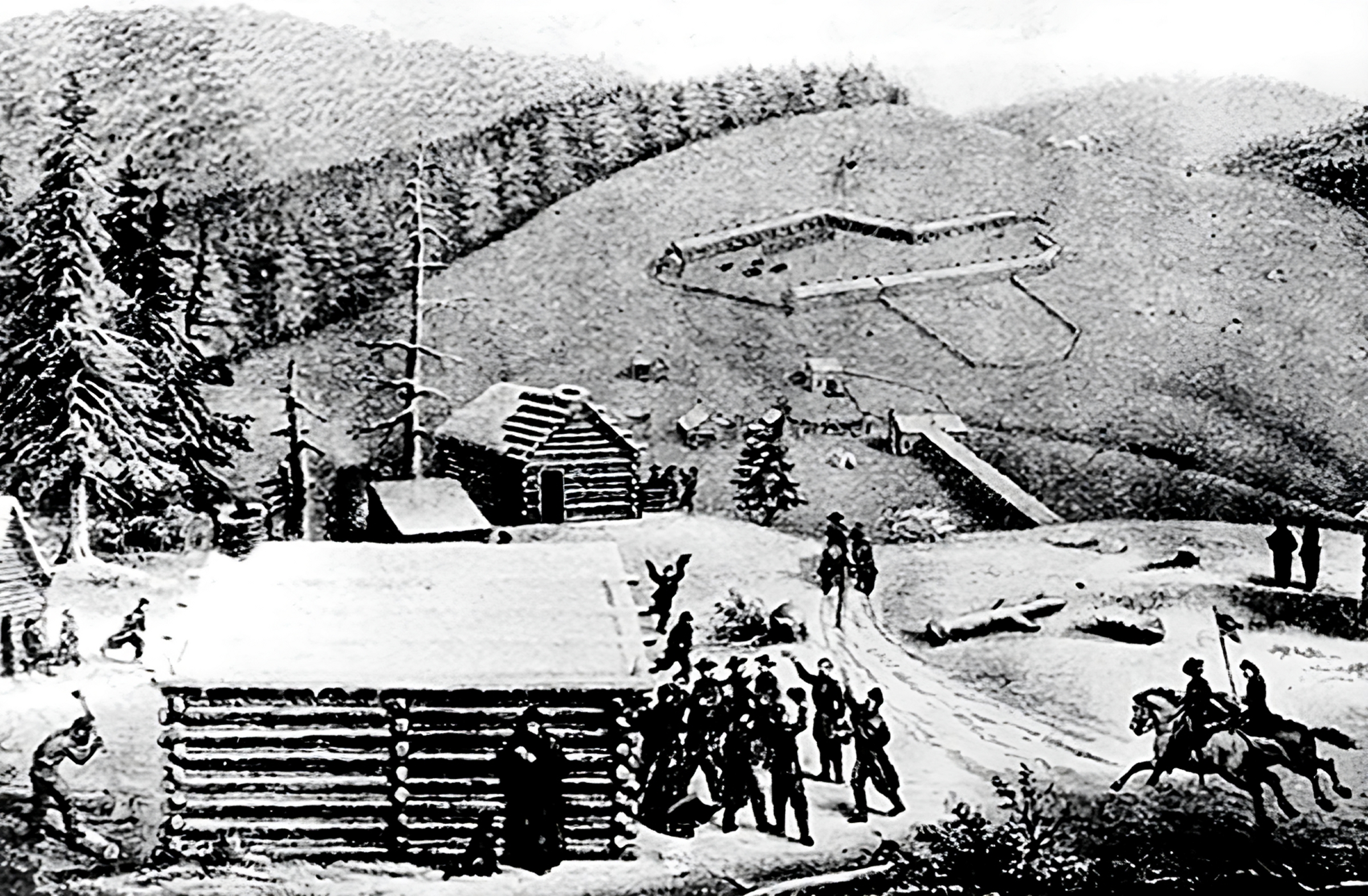
Fort Monroe on Cheat Summit. Observing the fort and the entrenchments on Cheat Summit, a Confederate Colonel declares, "It would be madness to make an attack." (Virginia State Archives).

In September 1861, General Robert E. Lee ordered the Army of the Northwest to isolate and capture Cheat Summit Fort. On September 12, in the cover of a stormy night, the Confederates advanced on the fort, overrunning a party of guards and killing a lieutenant. At daylight, a wagon train guarded by the 24th Ohio left the summit for Camp Elkwater—about eight miles away—but was ambushed and captured by Rust's brigade.

A fight erupted at the pass 5 miles northwest of camp when Anderson's Brigade was engaged by 60 scouts under Capt. John Coons of the 14th Indiana. Anderson's Brigade didn't commit to the fight, but Col. Kimball, hearing the gunfire in the distance, ordered Capt. Higgins to relieve the scouts. 90 men under Capt. David Higgins discovered the pillaged Union wagon train about half a mile from the camp and found a lone cavalryman leading a wounded horse. The man claimed that the scouts had been cut off, and Anderson's men had collected in large force around the entrance of the pass.

Higgins sent a squad into the woods on each side of the road and proceeded cautiously, ordering the line to cover themselves in the trees. Lieutenant Green and his men were deployed on the left of the road. Lieutenant Wood and his men were deployed on the right, holding the detail of the 24th Ohio as reserves to check any enemy advance on the road. They proceeded 3 rods before they were engaged by Anderson's Brigade, trading two volleys of at least 100 guns each and taking no loss of their own. The rebels fled up the road, where Lieutenant Green's men poured a terrible volley into the rebels, sending them into utter confusion. Despite the success, Green failed to rally his men, who, seeing such a large force, fell back to the reserve, bringing with them two wounded privates. Higgins directed his line forward, but they made no advance. Higgins eventually determined to hold the position, awaiting support.

After half an hour, Major Harrow of the 14th Indiana arrived with two companies. They brought two prisoners and reported that the force they faced was Anderson's brigade of Tennesseans, numbering 3,000. Harrow ordered Higgins to draw in his men as an advanced guard 2 miles from camp, where they remained until morning. The whole engagement only lasted about half an hour.

Over the following days, the 24th Ohio pursued the retreating rebels, recapturing their lost comrades and claiming heavy losses for the Confederates. The Confederates retreated due to exhaustion from the rough terrain and weather, and the captured men of the 24th Ohio convinced them that the Union defenders outnumbered them. The exact amount of Confederate losses is unknown. However, estimates from the time ranged between 50 and several hundred killed. Union casualties were reported as 10 killed, 14 wounded, and 64 captured.

== Service ==
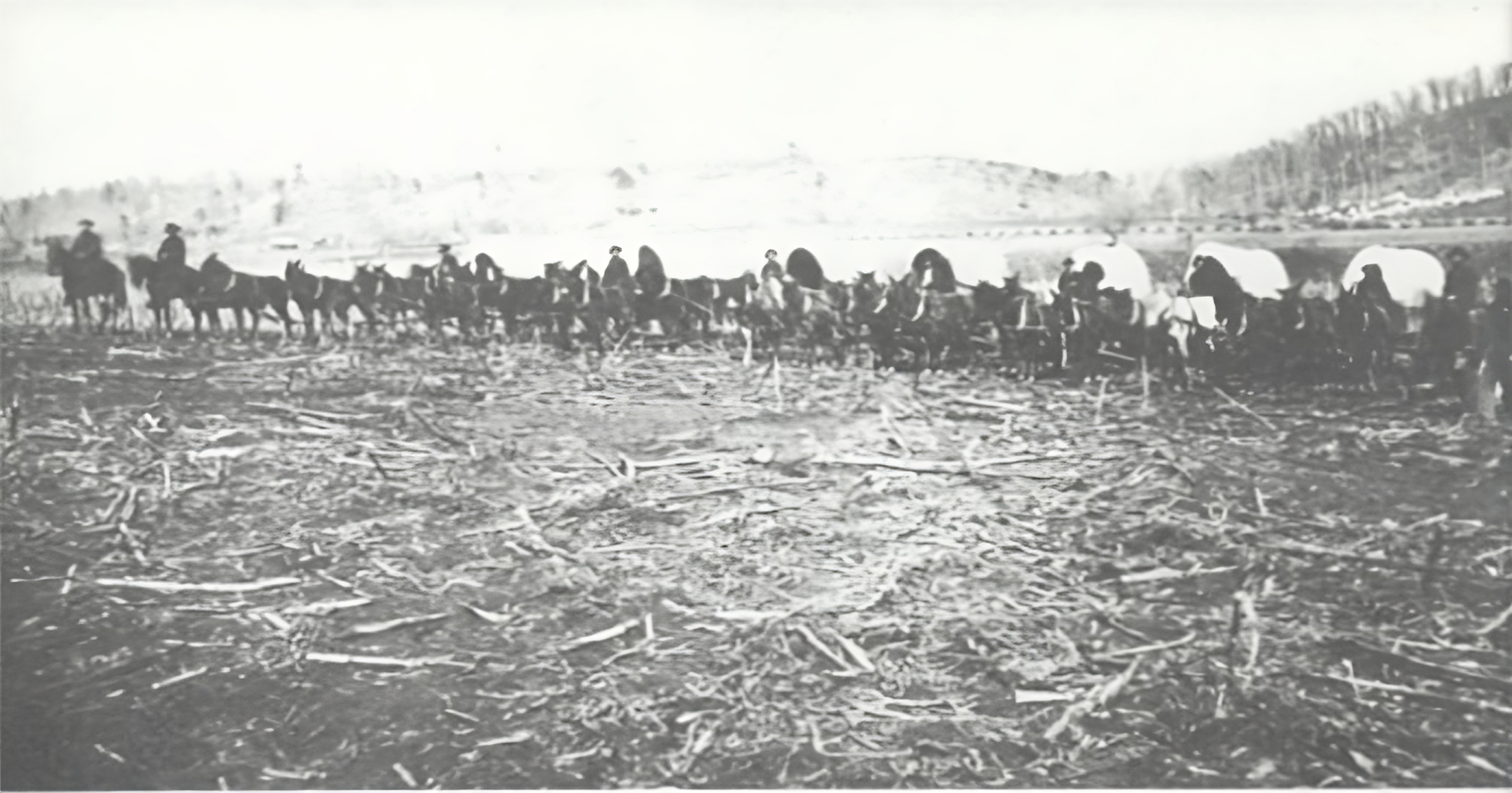
3rd Brigade wagons, Blue Springs, Tennessee

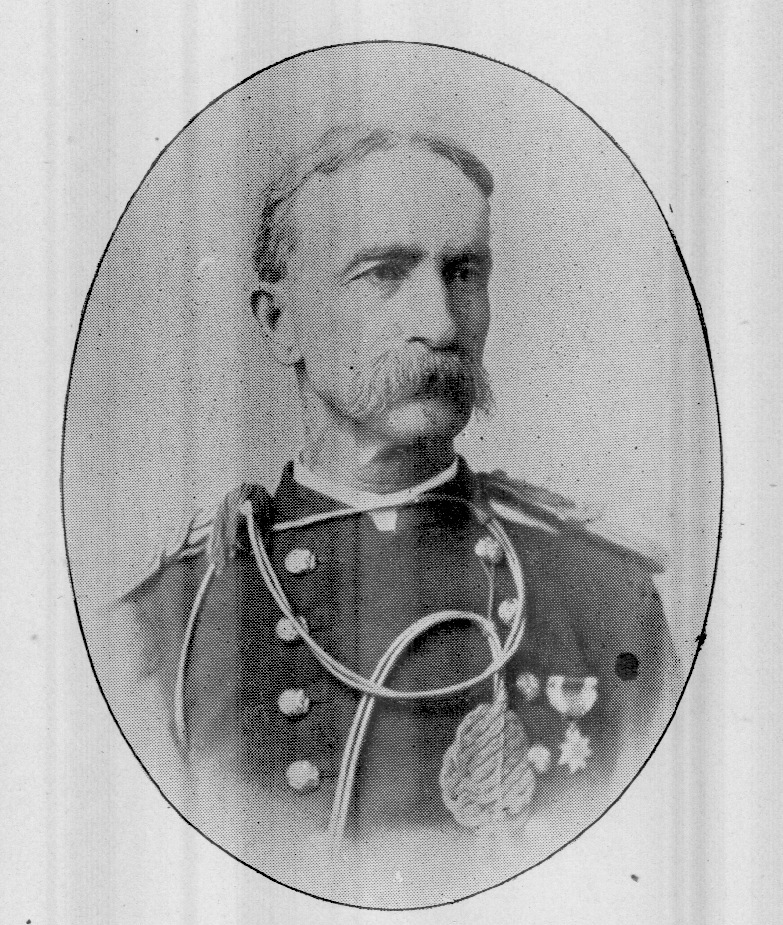
Sergeant Major Edgar R. Kellogg

Recruited from Adams County, Ohio, Columbiana County, Ohio, Coshocton County, Ohio, Cuyahoga County, Ohio, Erie County, Ohio, Highland County, Ohio, Huron County, Ohio, Mahoning County, Ohio, Montgomery County, Ohio, Muskingum County, Ohio, Ottawa County, Ohio, and Trumbull County, Ohio.

The 24th Ohio Infantry Regiment was organized at Camp Jackson and Camp Chase near Columbus, Ohio and mustered in for three years service on June 17, 1861, under the command of Colonel Jacob Ammen.

The regiment was attached to Cheat Mountain Brigade, West Virginia, to November 1861. 10th Brigade, Army of the Ohio, to December 1861. 10th Brigade, 4th Division, Army of the Ohio, to September 1862. 10th Brigade, 4th Division, II Corps, Army of the Ohio, to November 1862. 3rd Brigade, 2nd Division, Left Wing, XIV Corps, Army of the Cumberland, to January 1863. 3rd Brigade, 2nd Division, XXI Corps, Army of the Cumberland, to October 1863. 3rd Brigade, 1st Division, IV Corps, Army of the Cumberland, to April 1864. 1st Separate Brigade, Post of Chattanooga, Tennessee, Department of the Cumberland, to June 1864.

The 24th Ohio Infantry mustered out of service at Columbus, Ohio, beginning on June 17, 1864, and ending June 24, 1864. Company D reenlisted and became Company D, 18th O.V.V.I., mustering in November 1864, and discharged on October 22, 1865.

== Detailed service ==
Left Ohio for western Virginia July 26, reaching Cheat Mountain Summit August 14. Operations on Cheat Mountain, Va., September 11–17, 1861. Action at Cheat Mountain September 12. Greenbrier River October 3–4 and October 31. Moved to Louisville, Ky., November 18, thence to Camp Wickliffe and duty there until February 1862. Advance on Nashville, Tenn., February 14–25. Occupation of Nashville February 25-March 18. March to Savannah, Tenn., March 18-April 6. Battle of Shiloh, Tenn., April 6–7. Advance on and siege of Corinth, Miss., April 29-May 30. Occupation of Corinth May 30. Pursuit to Booneville May 30-June 12. Buell's Campaign in northern Alabama and middle Tennessee June to August. At Athens, Ala., until July 17. At Murfreesboro and McMinnville, Tenn., until August 17. March to Louisville, Ky., in pursuit of Bragg August 17-September 26. Pursuit of Bragg to London, Ky., October 1–22. Battle of Perryville, Ky., October 8. Nelson's Cross Roads October 18. March to Nashville, Tenn., October 22-November 7, and duty there until December 26. Advance on Murfreesboro December 26–30. Battle of Stones River December 30–31, 1862 and January 1–3, 1863. Action at Woodbury January 24, 1863. Duty at Readyville until June. Tullahoma Campaign June 23-July 7. At Manchester until August 16. Passage of Cumberland Mountains and Tennessee River and Chickamauga Campaign August 16-September 7. Battle of Chickamauga September 19–20. Siege of Chattanooga, Tenn., September 24-November 23. Reopening Tennessee River October 26–29. Chattanooga-Ringgold Campaign November 23–27. Battles of Lookout Mountain November 23–24. Missionary Ridge November 25. Ringgold Gap, Taylor's Ridge, November 27. Duty at Shellmound until February 1864. Demonstration on Dalton, Ga., February 22–27, 1864. Near Dalton February 23. Buzzard's Roost Gap and Rocky Faced Ridge February 23–25. Garrison duty at Chattanooga, Tenn., until June.

== Casualties ==
24th Ohio Statistics
Total Men	1201	
Killed/Mortal Wound	5.66%	68
Died POW	0.33%	4
Died Disease	8.99%	108
Disabled	12.57%	151
Deserted	0%	0
Missing	12.99%	156
Total Cass. Rate	40.54%	487

336 men never returned home from service; 6 officers and 62 enlisted men killed or mortally wounded, 2 officers and 106 enlisted men died of disease. It is worth noting that the regiment often failed to promptly report wounded soldiers, and many were never reported. None of the Adams County men (Co. D) have records of wounds on the official roster. Those wounded all died of their wounds, or else no record was made. The regiment reports no desertion. Including non-disabling wounds, more soldiers were wounded than the regiment's total size.

== Notable Commanders ==
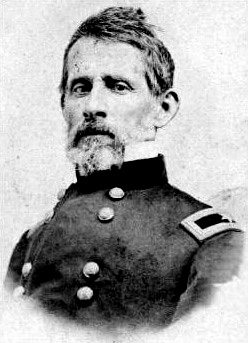
Colonel Jacob Ammen

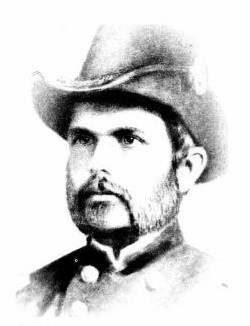
Albert Sereno Hall

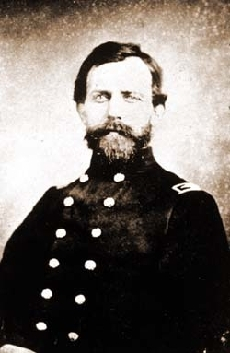
Lieutenant-Colonel Samuel Augustus Gilbert

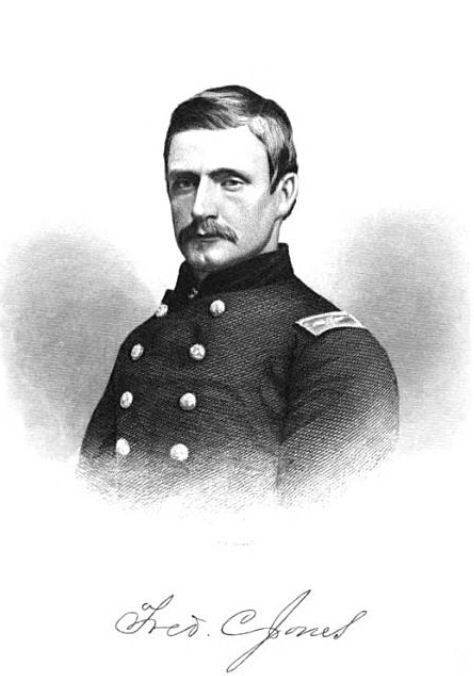
Lieutenant-Colonel Frederick C. Jones

- Colonel Jacob Ammen - West Point graduate 1831; promoted to Brigadier General on July 16, 1862; nicknamed "Uncle Jake."
- Colonel Frederick C. Jones - Commanded at the Battle of Perryville as Lieutenant-Colonel; killed at the Battle of Stones River.
- Colonel David J. Higgins - Often couldn't command due to persistent debilitating rheumatism; dismissed for cowardice at the Battle of Chickamauga, though he was acquitted; nicknamed "The Reverend Colonel Higgins."
- (Brevet Brigadier General) Lieutenant-Colonel Samuel Augustus Gilbert - Civil Engineer for the United States Coast Survey; transferred to 44th Ohio as Colonel, October 14, 1861
- Lieutenant-Colonel Lucien C. Buttles - Resigned November 28, 1861.
- Lieutenant-Colonel Albert Sereno Hall - Enlisted as a private; severely wounded at Shiloh; June 12, 1861, appointed Colonel of the 105th Ohio; advocate for women's rights and hospital reforms; died of illness in regimental hospital near Murfreesboro, July 10, 1863.
- Major Shelton Sturgess - Resigned November 28, 1861.
- Major Thomas M. McClure - Dismissed for cowardice at the Battle of Chickamauga.
- Major William B. Sturges - October 1861, near Cheat Mountain Summit, fell down a rocky gorge and permanently broke his knee; mustered out with regiment June 24, 1864.
- Major Henry Terry - Commanded at the Battle of Stones River after Col. Jones' death for only minutes before being killed by a fragment of shell to the head.
- Captain Enoch Weller - Commanded at the Battle of Stones River after Lieut. Benjamin J. Horton was severely wounded; was killed when the regiment was flanked the next day.
- (Lieutenant-Colonel) Captain A. T. M. Cockerill - Briefly commanded at the Battle of Stones River after Capt. Weller's death; in command of the regiment before muster out, June 24, 1864.
- Sergeant Major Edgar R. Kellogg - June 20, 1861, promoted from Sergeant Co. A; to 2nd Lieutenant Co. A.
- Sergeant Major Furley D. Bisett - September 28, 1861, promoted from 1st Sergeant Co. B; to 2nd Lieutenant Co. H.
- Sergeant Major Charles R. Harman - Assumed command at the Battle of Stones River after Maj. Terry's death, but was killed instantly by canister shot.
- Sergeant Major Charles G. Morehouse - May 1, 1863, promoted from Corporal Co. A; to 2nd Lieutenant Co. K.
- Sergeant Major John D Vance - Badly wounded in the Summer of 1861, so the surgeon ordered a coffin to be built for him; promoted from Private Co. D July 4, 1861; mustered out with regiment June 24, 1864.
- Captain Moses J. Patterson - A popular figure in the regiment; died September 2, 1861, at Beverly, WV.
- Captain Isaac N. Dryden - Commanded at the Battle of Stones River, Battle of Chickamauga, Siege of Chattanooga; severely wounded September 20, 1863, at Chattanooga; died October 1, 1863. of wounds received in the Battle of Chickamauga; nicknamed "The Hero Soldier."
- (Captain) 1st Lieutenant Benjamin J. Horton - Briefly commanded at the Battle of Stones River until his leg was fractured so severely it needed amputation; resigned June 10, 1863.
- Captain Dewitt C. Wadsworth - Commanded at the Battle of Chickamauga; struck twice and killed by Minié ball while attempting to save a wounded Private; sobriquet "The Brave."
- (Captain) 1st Lieutenant Daniel W. McCoy - Commanded at the Battle of Chickamauga until severely wounded; promoted to Captain April 21, 1864; mustered out with regiment June 24, 1864.

== Regimental Colors ==
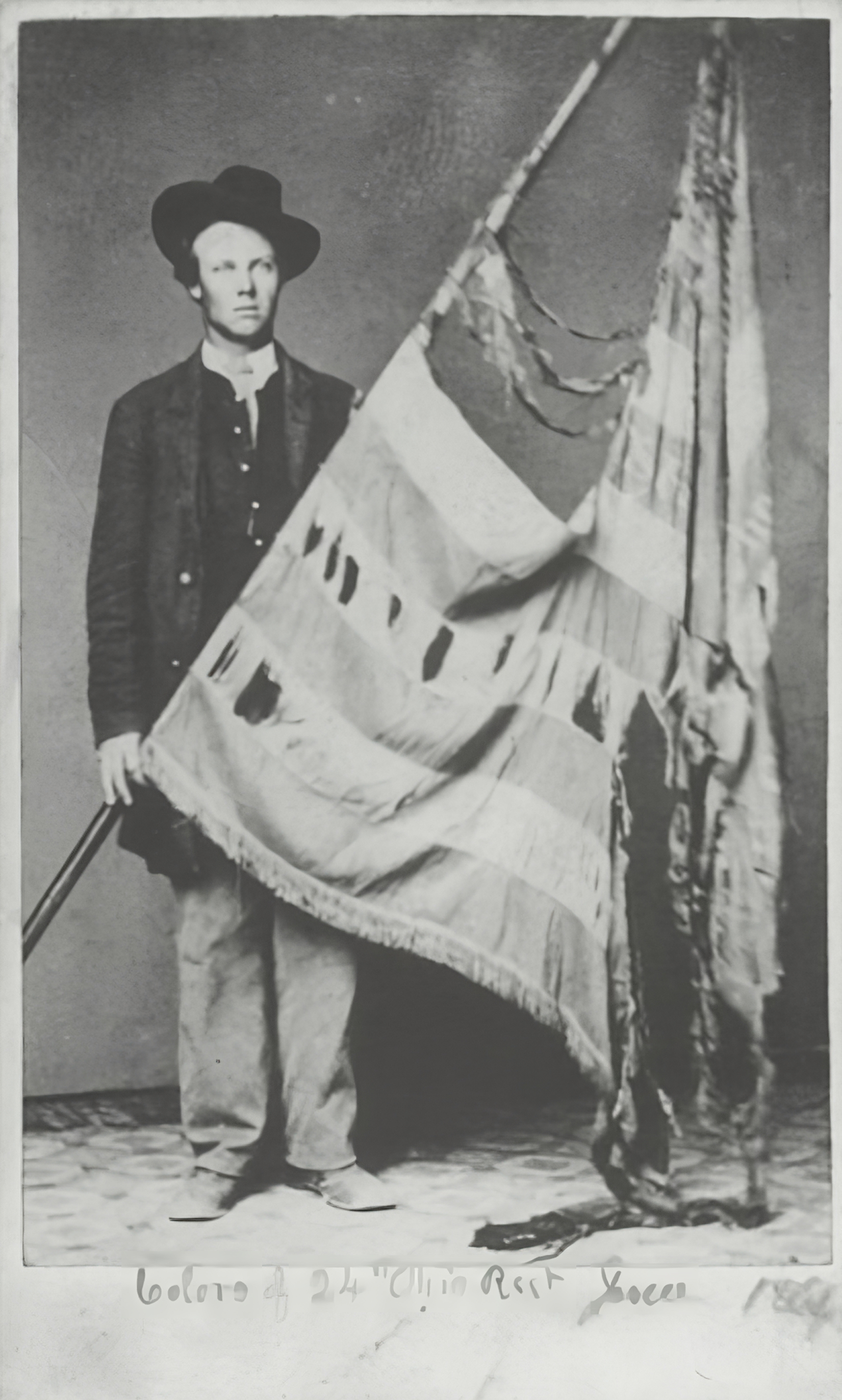
During the Battle of Stones River, the flag sustained significant damage; the Battle-axe was shot away, two bullets shattered its staff, and twenty-three holes pierced its folds.

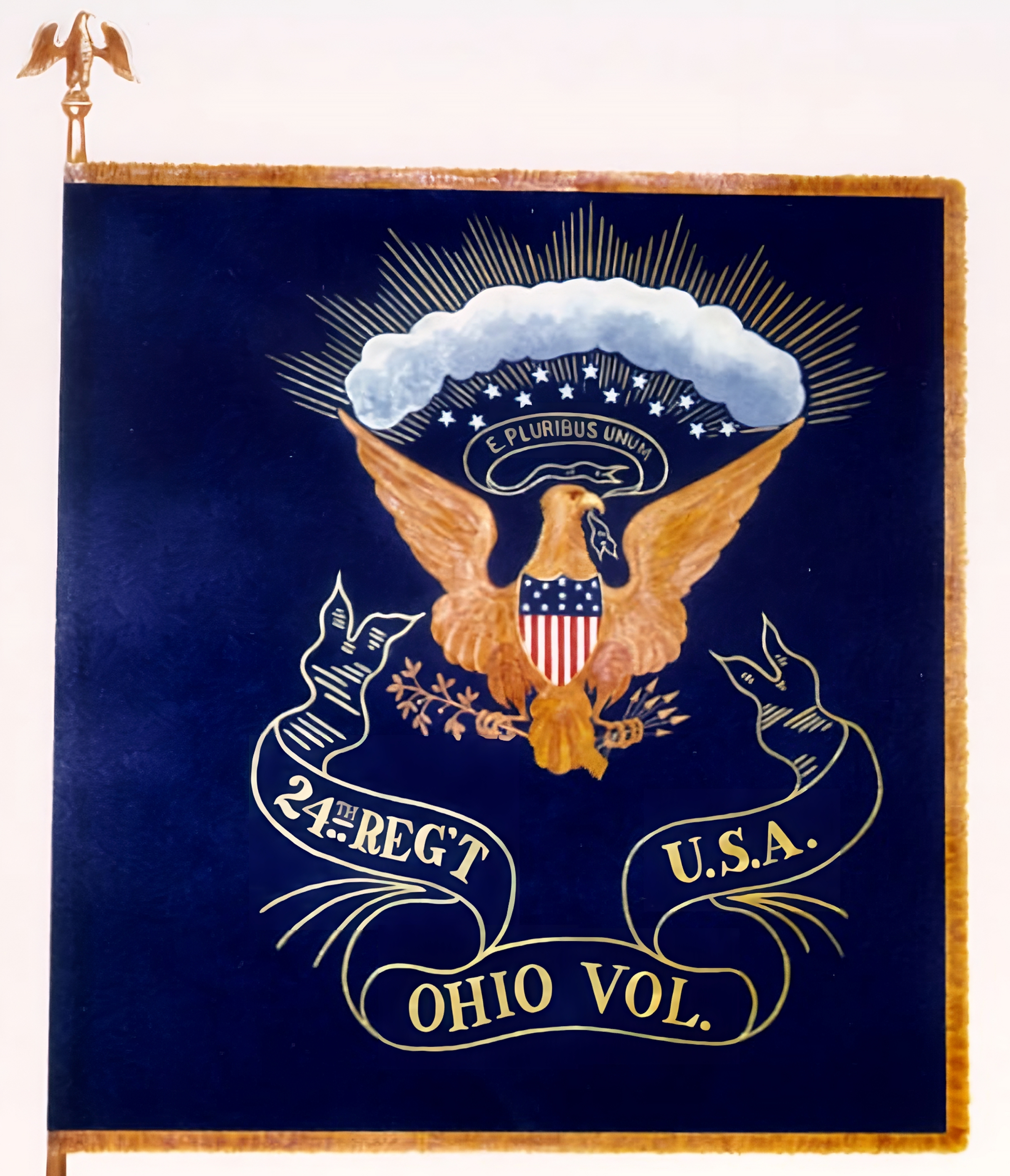
24th O.V.I. Regimental Color

In January 1862, Colonel Jacob Ammen reached out to his wife in Brown County, Ohio, asking her to travel to Cincinnati to obtain a regulation regimental flag for the 24th Ohio. The regiment had been using a non-regulation merino wool flag as their national color up to that point in the war, which had been hastily completed by Lieutenant Dewitt Clinton Wadsworth's wife and three neighbors in Erie County, Ohio before the county's volunteers had left for training. Although the wool flag had served them well, Colonel Ammen felt that a regimental flag was necessary for the regiment's honor. By February 1862, the silk regimental colors had arrived and were presented to Major Albert S. Hall during the regiment's dress parade.

Later in April 1862, members of the 6th Ohio, inspired by the bravery of their brother regiment during the Battle of Shiloh, raised funds to purchase a regulation national flag for the 24th Ohio. The flag arrived from the Cincinnati depot in May 1862, and was presented to the regiment by Major General William "Bull" Nelson. A few weeks later, a Cincinnati newspaper announced that the 24th Ohio's new national flag was the first to enter the Confederate works at Corinth, Mississippi, which was a fitting debut for the new flags.

Throughout the remaining two years of service, at least twelve color bearers carried these two flags. The flags bore the marks of their service, including numerous bullet holes, which attested to their honorable history.

Following the conclusion of the war, the silk flags were retired and displayed in the "relic room" or rotunda of the Ohio State House. They were occasionally used in special anniversary celebrations and parades, which evoked many proud memories of their Civil War service. In response, Governor John Brough gave this speech:

"Colonel Officers and Soldiers of the Twenty-Fourth:

I thank you in behalf of the people of the State of Ohio, not only for the colors, but for having borne them so nobly and gallantly as you have throughout the three years' service. They come worn and tattered; but there is not a rent in them that is not honorable, and an emblem of your bravery and gallantry. No regiment that has gone from Ohio has endured hardships with greater cheerfulness or more nobly discharged its duty. Yes, Sir [turning to the colonel], no matter what the future may bring forth, no regiment can occupy a better position than the one you have had the honor to command. I shall place these banners in the archives of the State as historic mementoes worthy of any people. Again, soldiers, I thank you."

== Reunions ==
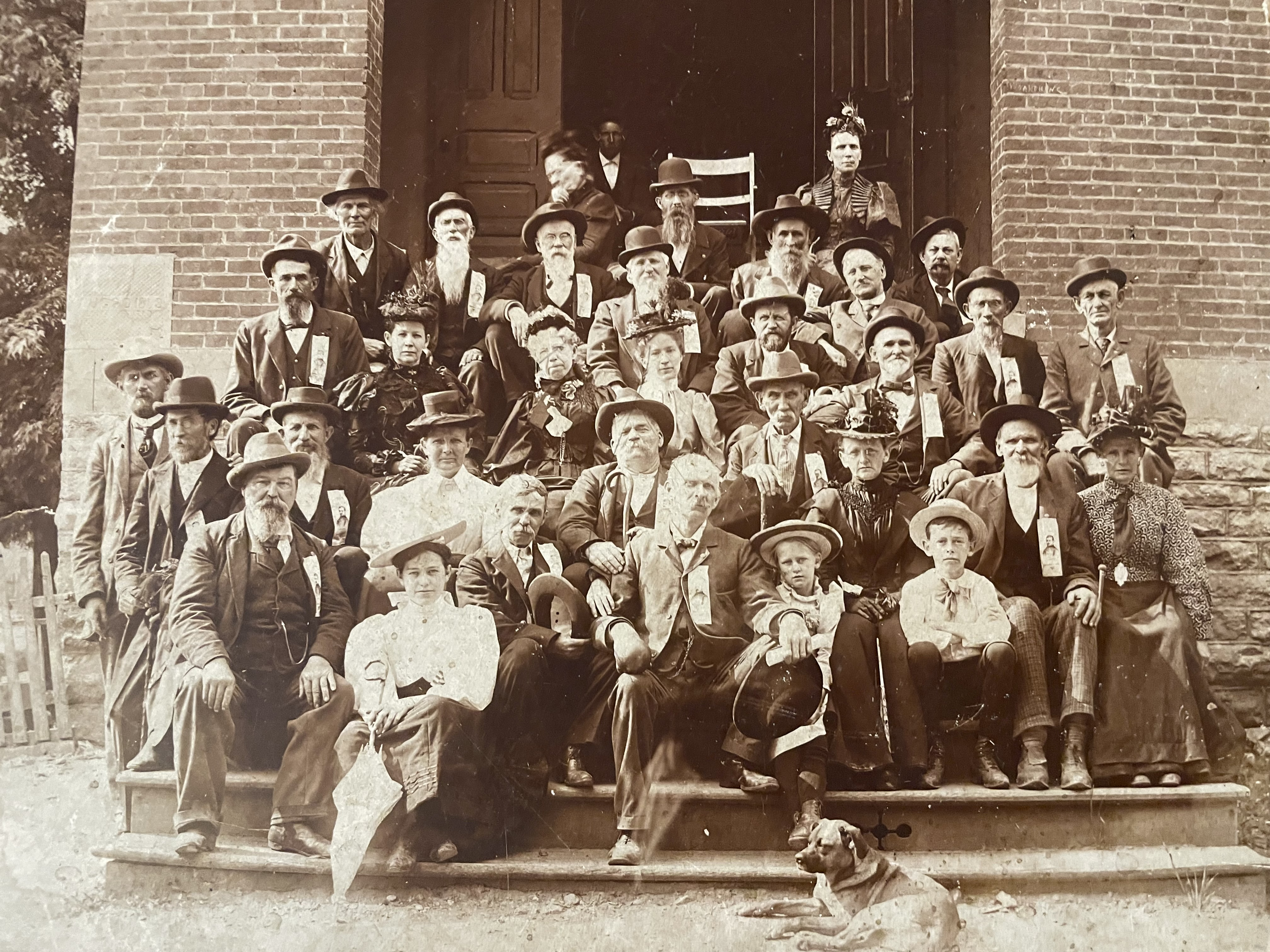
Reunion of Co. D, 24th O.V.I., Blue Creek, Ohio, Circa 1910

Community, loyalty, and pride in their service and what they fought for resonated through the veterans and their families for the rest of their lives. Reunions were regularly held for the soldiers of the 24th Ohio, 6th Ohio, 33rd Ohio, 70th Ohio, 36th Indiana, 84th Illinois, and 23rd Kentucky. These reunions were attended by generals, officers, and veterans of neighboring regiments. By 1886 only sixteen were left of the Twenty-Fourth Ohio, and what was likely the last reunion of this regiment was held in 1888 in Cleveland, Ohio.

== See also ==
- List of Ohio Civil War units
- Ohio in the Civil War
