= Samuel Augustus Gilbert =

American military officer and surveyor

Samuel Gilbert
- Samuel Augustus Gilbert
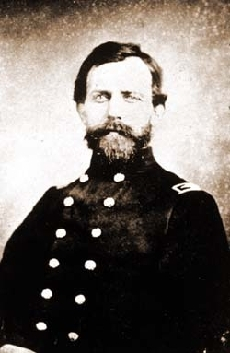
- Gilbert c. 1865
- Born: August 15, 1825; Zanesville, Ohio, U.S.
- Died: June 9, 1868 (aged 42); Saint Paul, Minnesota, U.S.
- Burial place: Oakland Cemetery, Saint Paul, Minnesota, U.S.
- Children: 3, including Cass Gilbert
- Relatives: Charles Champion Gilbert (brother)
- Military career
- Allegiance: United States
- Branch: Union Army
- Service years: 1861–1864
- Rank: Colonel; Brevet Brigadier General
- Units: 24th Ohio Infantry Regiment; 44th Ohio Infantry Regiment
- Commands: 8th Ohio Cavalry Regiment
- Conflicts: American Civil War

Samuel Augustus Gilbert (August 15, 1825 – June 9, 1868) was an American surveyor, topographer, and military officer who served in the Union Army during the American Civil War. Gilbert was the younger brother of Charles Champion Gilbert and the father of American architect Cass Gilbert.

== Early life and career ==
Gilbert was born on August 15, 1825, in Zanesville, Ohio. Gilbert worked as a topographical engineer for the United States Coast Survey. From 1851 to 1853 Gilbert assisted in the triangulation of Biloxi Bay, Mississippi City, Mississippi, Cat Island, Bayou Pierre, Point Clear, Alabama, East Rigolets Light, Tower Dupre (a Martello tower in Lake Borgne), and Battery Bienvenue near the Gulf Coast of the United States.

== Military service ==
At the outbreak of the American Civil War Gilbert volunteered for service in the Union Army and was commissioned with the rank of Major of the 24th Ohio Infantry Regiment on June 10, 1861. Gilbert was promoted to the rank of Lieutenant Colonel on June 22, 1861, and transferred to the 44th Ohio Infantry Regiment. Gilbert was eventually promoted to the rank of Colonel in January 1864 and given command of the 8th Ohio Cavalry Regiment. On March 13, 1865, Gilbert was promoted to the rank of brevet Brigadier General for meritorious service. Gilbert resigned from the military on April 20, 1864.

== Later life ==
Following his military service Gilbert continued to work for the United States Coast Survey until his death on June 9, 1868, in Saint Paul, Minnesota. Gilbert is buried in Oakland Cemetery in Saint Paul.

== Personal life ==
Gilbert was married to Elizabeth Fulton Wheeler of Zanesville. Gilbert was the father of Cass Gilbert, the architect of the Minnesota State Capitol, the Arkansas State Capitol, and the West Virginia State Capitol, among many other notable works.

== See also ==
- List of American Civil War brevet generals
