= Battle of Vaught's Hill =

Battle of the American Civil War

Coordinates: 35.92523°N 86.2047°W

- Part of the American Civil War
Date	March 20, 1863
Location	Rutherford County, Tennessee
Result	Union victory

Belligerents
United States (Union)	(Confederate States of America) CSA (Confederacy)

Commanders and leaders
Albert Sereno Hall	John Hunt Morgan

Units involved
101st Ohio Infantry; 105th Indiana Infantry; 80th Illinois Infantry; 123rd Illinois Infantry; 1st Tennessee Cavalry	Morgan's Cavalry Division

Strength
1,300	~3,500

Casualties and losses
48–62 casualties	180–373 casualties

The Battle of Vaught's Hill, also known as the Battle of Milton, took place during the American Civil War on March 20, 1863, in Rutherford County, Tennessee. The infantry brigade of Union Colonel Albert Sereno Hall won against the cavalry division of Confederate brigadier general John Hunt Morgan.

== Background ==
During the American Civil War, the Union Army in Tennessee lost the Battle of Thompson's Station on March 5, 1863. On March 18, Union colonel Albert S. Hall left Murfreesboro, and went northeast on a reconnaissance mission with 1,300 men. He was supposed to find Confederate brigadier general John Hunt Morgan, whose army had been raiding Tennessee. Hall's army was made up of the 101st Ohio, 105th Indiana, 80th Illinois and 123rd Illinois infantries, the 1st Tennessee Cavalry, and had one of the 9th Indiana Artillery's batteries.

== Prelude ==
Hall eventually started returning to Murfreesboro, and on March 20, he met Morgan's cavalry division of around 3,500 men. Learning that Morgan had a large army, Hall started taking up position on Vaught's Hill in Rutherford County (one mile west of Milton and 14 miles from Murfreesboro).

== Battle ==
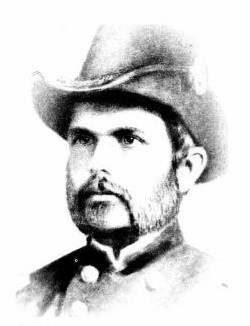
Albert Sereno Hall

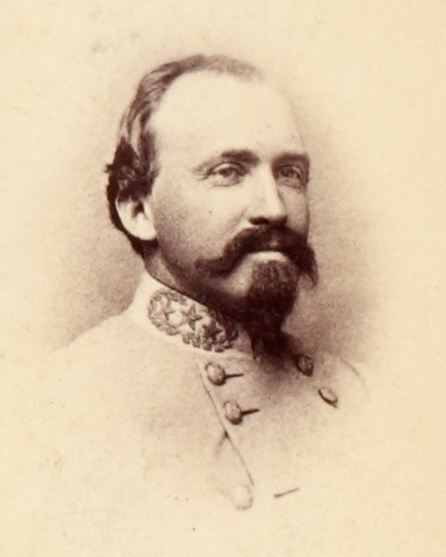
John Hunt Morgan

The Battle of Vaught's Hill, also known as the Battle of Milton, started at 11:30 a.m on March 20. Morgan's men dismounted, and started attacking the flanks and rear of Hall's men, who had not finished taking position. Hall's men were nearly encircled, but Morgan could gain no further advantage. Hall's army was protected by large rocks. Morgan's men launched assaults for three hours, each one defeated by Hall's artillery. Around 2:00 p.m., Morgan decided to stop engaging, learning that Union reinforcements were coming. However, his men still kept shelling for some time.

== Aftermath ==
The battle with ended with either 373 Confederate and 62 Union casualties, or 180 Confederate casualties (30 dead, 150 wounded) and 48 Union casualties (6 killed, 42 wounded). Five days later, the Union suffered a major defeat at the Battle of Brentwood. Morgan's men started an ambitious raid into the North, and also lost heavily.
