= Edgar R. Kellogg =

American military officer

Edgar Romeyn Kellogg
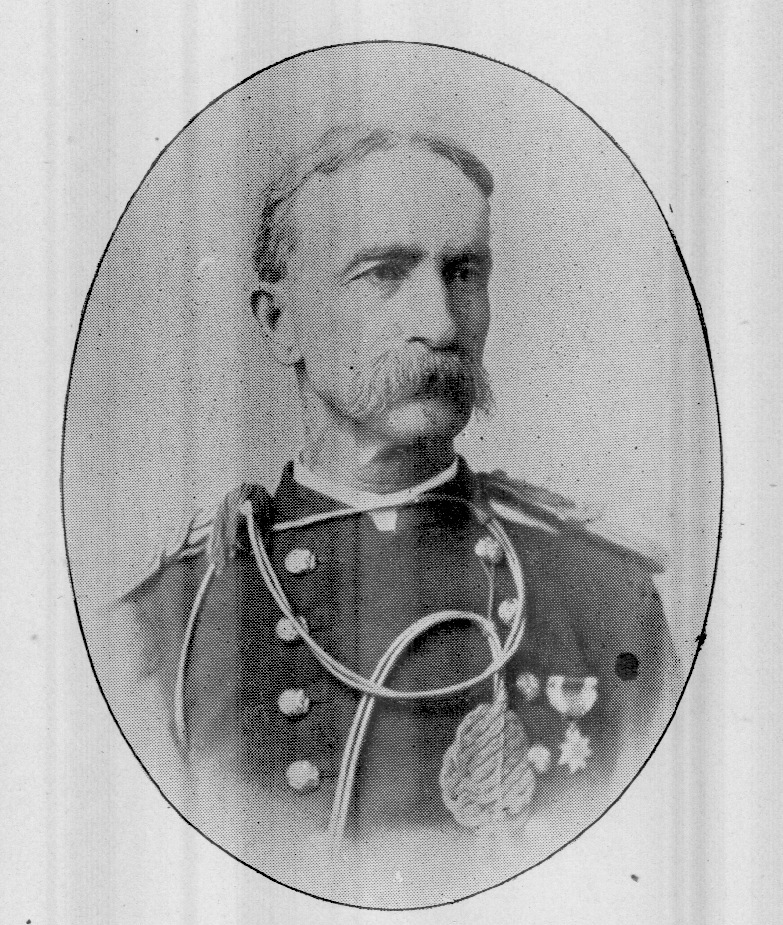
- Born: March 25, 1842; Newfield, New York, U.S.
- Died: October 9, 1914 (aged 72); Toledo, Ohio, U.S.
- Burial place: Woodlawn Cemetery, Norwalk, Ohio, U.S.
- Spouse: Mary Elizabeth Wickham (m. 1866)
- Children: 4
- Military career
- Allegiance: United States
- Branch: United States Army (Union Army)
- Service years: 1861 – 1899
- Rank: Brigadier General
- Units: 24th Ohio Infantry Regiment; 16th Infantry Regiment
- Commands: 10th Infantry Regiment
- Conflicts: American Civil War: Western Virginia Campaign; Battle of Greenbrier River; Federal Penetration up the Cumberland and Tennessee Rivers; Battle of Shiloh; Siege of Corinth; Stones River Campaign; Battle of Stones River; Tullahoma campaign; Battle of Hoover's Gap; Atlanta campaign; Battle of Jonesborough (WIA); Spanish–American War: Santiago Campaign; Battle of San Juan Hill; Siege of Santiago

Edgar Romeyn Kellogg (1842–1914) was an American brigadier general of the American Civil War and the Spanish–American War. He was a part of the 16th Infantry Regiment and participated at several battles of the war and commanded the 10th Infantry Regiment during the Spanish–American War.

== Childhood ==
Edgar was born on March 25, 1842, at Newfield, New York (Note: Some sources also state he was born at NYC) as the son of Dr. M. C. Kellogg who was the sixth generation descendant of Samuel Kellogg who came from England during the early colonial years of the United States. His mother, Elizabeth Swatwort Kellogg was of Dutch descent and was known as a poet and her most well known work was "Revolutionary Documents on Centennial Day". In 1855, Edgar moved with his parents to Fairfield, Ohio.

== American Civil War ==
After the Battle of Fort Sumter, Kellogg was studying law but he volunteered as a sergeant in the 24th Ohio Infantry Regiment before shortly being promoted to 2nd Lieutenant. He shortly resigned but then re-enlisted as a private in the 16th Infantry Regiment at Norwalk. After participating at the Battle of Shiloh, President Abraham Lincoln personally promoted Kellogg to 2nd Lieutenant due to his gallant and meritorious service at the battle. During the war, Kellogg was brevetted 2 times as he was brevetted captain after the Battle of Stones River and to major during the Battle of Jonesborough after being wounded 2 times at the battle. Kellogg also engaged at the battles of Greenbrier River, Corinith, Hoover's Gap and all battles of the Atlanta campaign.

== Reconstruction ==
After the war, Kellogg remained in the U.S. Army and was stationed in the Southern United States during the Reconstruction Era as well as sent to various outposts in the American West such as Fort Logan for the following years. He also married Mary Elizabeth Wickham on February 13, 1866, at Norwalk and proceeded to have 4 children with her. During this time, Kellogg remained a captain since February 13, 1865, until being promoted to lieutenant colonel in 1892.

== Spanish–American War ==
After the outbreak of the Spanish–American War, Kellogg was transferred to the 10th Infantry Regiment. He led the regiment at the Battle of San Juan Hill and the Siege of Santiago as a supporting regiment before being transferred to the 6th Infantry Regiment. However, Kellogg was struck with fever and sent back to the U.S. where he was promoted to brigadier general of Volunteers by President William McKinley where he remained until February 1899 where he was honorably discharged and reverted to a colonel of the 6th Infantry Regiment.

== Later years ==
When the Philippine–American War broke out, Kellogg embarked with his regiment for the Philippines but he was struck with illness again and had to be treated at a hospital in Honolulu. Shortly after, he was promoted to brigadier general but requested retirement in December 1899. After his retirement, Kellogg spent the remainder of his life with his family at Toledo and Baltimore before dying on October 9, 1914, and being buried at Woodlawn Cemetery at Norwalk.
