= Jacob Ammen =

Union Army General (1806-1894)

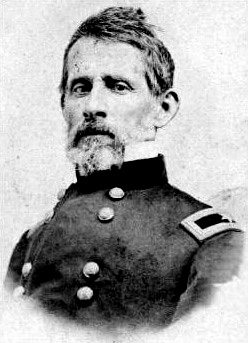
- Jacob Ammen photo taken between 1861 and 1865
- Born: January 7, 1806; Fincastle, Virginia, US
- Died: February 6, 1894 (aged 87); Lockland, Ohio, US
- Burial place: Spring Grove Cemetery, Cincinnati, Ohio, US
- Relatives: Daniel Ammen
- Military career
- Allegiance: United States of America; Union
- Branch: United States Army; Union Army
- Service years: 1831–1837, 1861–1865
- Rank: Brigadier General
- Commands: 4th Division, XXIII Corps; Camp Douglas
- Conflicts: American Civil War; Western Virginia campaign; Battle of Cheat Mountain; Battle of Greenbrier River; Battle of Shiloh; Siege of Corinth; Saltville Raid
- Other work: College professor, civil engineer

Jacob Ammen (January 7, 1806 – February 6, 1894) was a college professor, civil engineer, and a general in the Union Army during the American Civil War. His younger brother, Daniel Ammen, was an admiral in the United States Navy.

== Early life and career ==
Ammen was born in Fincastle, Virginia, but at a young age, his parents moved to Georgetown, Ohio, where Ammen attended school. He was an 1831 honors graduate of the United States Military Academy, where he was an assistant professor for two terms, in addition to his duties as a second lieutenant in the 1st U.S. Artillery. He also served as a drill instructor and captain in the Georgetown militia. He was stationed in Charleston Harbor during the Nullification Crisis.

Resigning from the Army in 1837, Ammen taught mathematics at Bacon College (now called Transylvania University), afterwards teaching in Jefferson College. From 1840 through 1843, he served as Chair of the Mathematics Department at Indiana University. He later taught again in Kentucky and Missouri, before moving in November 1855 to Ripley, Ohio, to work as a civil engineer.

== Civil War ==
Within a week after the Confederate bombardment of Fort Sumter in April 1861, Ammen rejoined the Federal army, serving as a captain in the newly raised 12th Ohio Infantry. He was soon commissioned as colonel of the 24th Ohio Infantry. After training at Camp Chase, Ammen's regiment was sent in late July to serve in western Virginia, seeing their first combat at the Battle of Cheat Mountain.

Shipped to the Western Theater, Ammen led a brigade in the Army of the Ohio at the Battle of Shiloh and the Siege of Corinth. Ammen was promoted to brigadier general on July 16, 1862. In August, Ammen assumed the division command vacated by William "Bull" Nelson, who had been given a new command and sent to defend Richmond, Kentucky.

When his health deteriorated, Ammen then performed administrative duty for nearly a year, commanding Camp Douglas in Illinois in early 1863, as well as other Federal garrisons. In late 1863, he returned to the field and commanded the Fourth Division of the XXIII Corps. In September 1864, his 800-man force blocked the vital Virginia and Tennessee Railroad at Bull's Gap, Tennessee, during Stephen G. Burbridge's Saltville raid. Shortly before the end of the war, he resigned in January 1865 and returned home.

== Postbellum career ==
Ammen was a surveyor and civil engineer in Hamilton County, Ohio, then he purchased a farm near Beltsville, Maryland, in 1872. Two years later, he was involved in determining possible routes for the proposed Panama Canal. He served on the board of visitors at West Point in 1875. He retired to Wyoming, Ohio, near Cincinnati.

Becoming blind in his elderly years, he moved in with his son in Lockland, Ohio, in 1891, where he died on February 6, 1894. He was buried in the Spring Grove Cemetery in Cincinnati.

== See also ==
- List of American Civil War generals (Union)
- Bibliography of the American Civil War
