= Bayou Bienvenue =

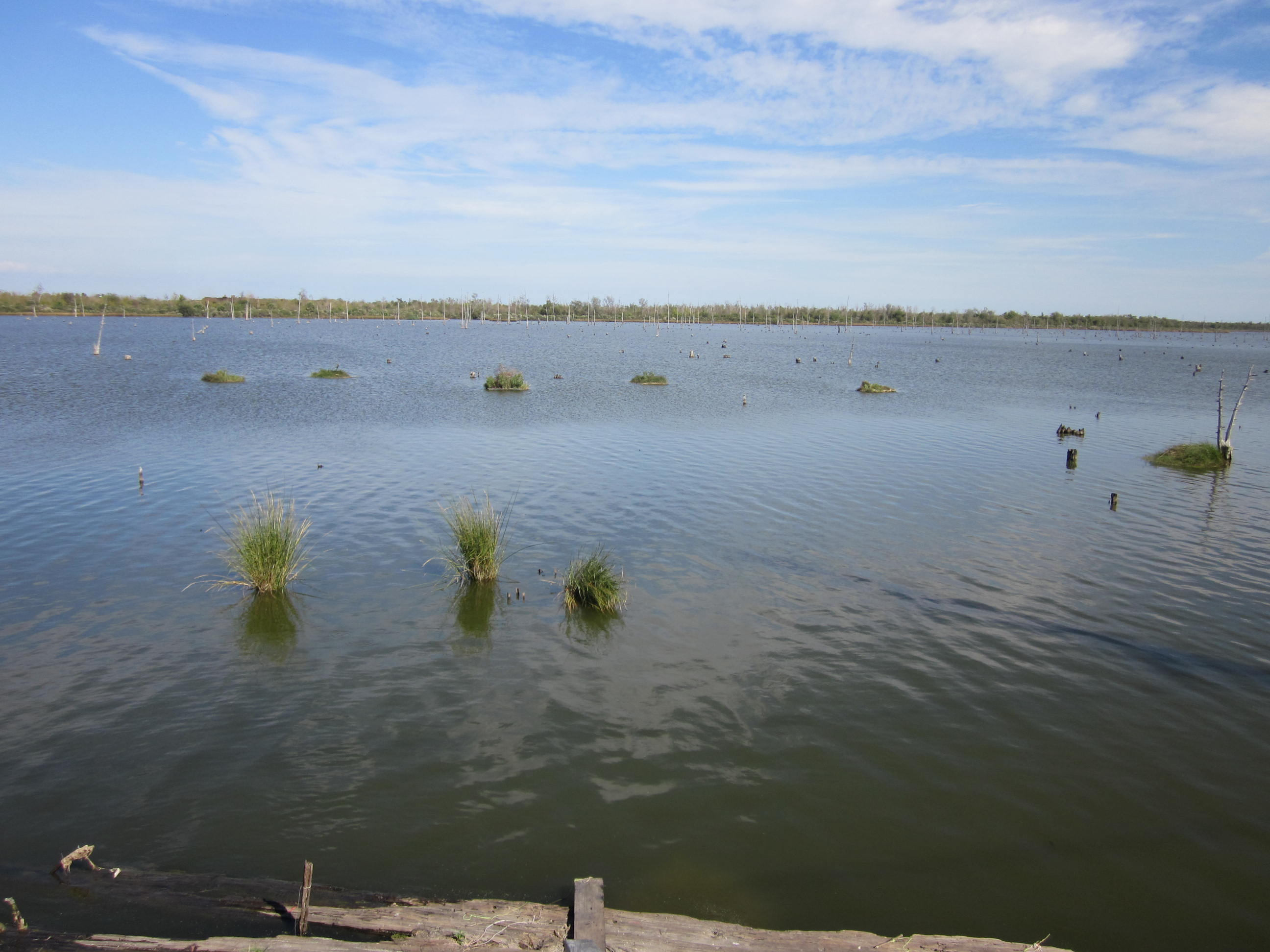
- Bayou Bienvenue
- Bayou Bienvenue

Physical characteristics
- Source
  - location: Mississippi River–Gulf Outlet Canal
  - coordinates: 29°59′54″N 89°54′57″W
- Mouth: Lake Borgne
  - coordinates: 29°59′59″N 89°51′40″W
- Length: 12.1 miles (19.5 km)

Bayou Bienvenue is a 12.1-mile-long (19.5 km) bayou and "ghost swamp" in southeastern Louisiana. It runs along the political border between Orleans Parish and St. Bernard Parish to the east of New Orleans. The Bayou Bienvenue Wetlands Triangle viewing platform in the Lower Ninth Ward provides expansive views of the bayou and also serves as an educational resource about restoration efforts in the area.

A part of the central wetlands system that ran from the Lower 9th Ward all the way to Lake Borgne, today only roughly 400 acres remain of the once thriving cypress swamp. Like other freshwater bayous throughout the Mississippi River Delta, Bayou Bienvenue consisted of old growth cypress and many native species of plants and animals; "What is now open water used to be an old–growth swamp that was filled with cypress trees, water lilies, and freshwater wildlife such as fish, alligators, otters, birds, and crawfish. The cypress trees were once so thick you could pull yourself along in a canoe or pirogue just by reaching out to grab cypress knees."

Beyond its ecological significance, Bayou Bienvenue has served cultural functions to the populations of the surrounding areas throughout the area's history of human occupation. Archaeological digs have yielded evidence that indigenous peoples of hunter-gatherer societies inhabited the area as far back as 400 A.D. The arrival of French explorers in the late 1600s began nearly two centuries of disagreements, disputes, and armed confrontations between French, Spanish, British and later American interests as the colonial era of North America progressed. Bayou Bienvenue gained its name during the initial French occupation; 'bayou bienvenue' is French for "welcome bayou".

From the beginning of European exploration of North America, slave labor was used to facilitate the interests of the colonizing powers. Under French rule, the enslaved population included indigenous peoples as well as Africans brought to the Americas in the Atlantic slave trade. By 1828, New Orleans was center of the United States slave trade. With its location five miles from the center of New Orleans, Bayou Bienvenue became home to a community of Maroons, freed slaves.

Who were Maroons, and what was their relationship to [the landscape of Bayou Bienvenue]?

Maroons were self-described liberated enslaved people who lived in the wetlands. For Europeans, the wetlands were associated with death and fear, but for Maroons they held the possibility of new life. Liberated enslaved people, especially of African origin, would escape into the wetlands because of the similarity to the landscapes of their origins. Maroons lived alongside Indigenous communities that were there before them, like the Chitimacha and Choctaw Tribes and Acadians, who had arrived when Britain colonized Canada. These societies developed various techniques for living in the wetland environment without damaging it, including raised housing, small watercraft-like pirogues, and a new cuisine of alligator and turtles. Each group brought their knowledge of cooking, animals, plants, medicines, and building.

Eventually, industry and plantations began to exert pressures on these communities and how they used the landscape. To earn money, Maroons made wares with grass-weaving techniques they had learned from the Chitimacha. Enslaved people whom Maroons had relationships with would take the wares and sell them at the slave market in New Orleans. Lumber companies would also bring enslaved people into the wetlands to harvest cypress for building materials. Through the connections between the enslaved and Maroons, lumber companies would pay Maroons, who were deeper in the wetlands, to cut timber. However, this practice was not beneficial to Maroon communities because the logging participated in the destruction of the wetlands that protected them. As the wetlands became navigable with more shipping channels and canals, the Maroons were increasingly hunted down. Maroon communities still existed in wetlands elsewhere, like Brazil and Jamaica, but in Bayou Bienvenue their communities ceased to exist either through capture or destruction of the landscape that had sustained them.

Though in 1769, the Spanish government abolished the enslavement of indigenous people, the Maroon communities of the swamps surrounding New Orleans were a major source of anxiety for the powerful leaders of Spanish Louisiana. The Maroons' reputation grew to mythical proportions, though their numbers were significantly lower than what the Spanish government believed. Jean Saint Malo led a group of Maroons in the areas west of Bayou Bienvenue between 1780 and 1784, when Spanish Lieutenant Governor Francisco Bouligny was ordered to eradicate the Maroons, including Saint Malo's group. After Saint Malo's capture and subsequent execution, Maroon communities were largely driven out of the greater New Orleans area, including Bayou Bienvenue, by the late 1700s. The area remained significant throughout for its connection for ships to travel between the New Orleans area and Lake Borgne, creating a shortcut to the Gulf of Mexico, throughout the transition to American rule after the Louisiana Purchase. This proved of significant benefit to the British during the Battle of New Orleans in 1814.

"The British had done the impossible. Two officers, disguised as locals, had found the one bayou leading from Lake Bourgne to the Mississippi River that the Creoles, ignoring Jackson’s repeated orders, had failed to block. Suitably named Bienvenue, it had welcomed (with an assist from the smaller Bayou Mazant and a connecting canal) the midnight passage of General Keane, 2,080 men, and two guns to firm ground on the Villeré plantation along the Mississippi. At dawn on December 23, they had surrounded and taken prisoner the militia detachment supposedly guarding the bayou."

The British were defeated after the Battle of New Orleans, waged just five miles downriver from New Orleans and just beyond Bayou Bienvenue at the Chalmette Battlefield in St. Bernard Parish. A short distance from the Lake end of Bayou Bienvenue, the remains of Battery Bienvenue still guard the eastern approach to the city. This fortification was built shortly after 1815's Battle of New Orleans to prevent any future invasion of the city by way of the Lake and Bayou.

The growth of New Orleans in the early 20th century led to part of Bayou Bienvenue being drained for expansion of the city. In the 1920s, the dredging and installation of locks creating the Industrial Canal, which connected Lake Pontchartrain to the Mississippi River, marked the beginning of the man-made interference that lead to the eventual demise of the Bayou Bienvenue cypress swamp.

The creation of the Mississippi River Gulf Outlet in the 1960s "funneled (salt water) directly into the bayou from the Gulf, and quickly killed the cypresses, oaks and almost every other tree, as well as much of the shrub and grass. The wildlife vanished with the habitat ... the area has been decimated, eroded and virtually marinated in salt water." Today a "ghost swamp", the only visible remnants of the Bayou before its man-made destruction are the skeleton-like, limbless trunks of the dead cypress trees rising out of the brackish water.

The bayou crosses the Gulf Intracoastal Waterway and Mississippi River Gulf Outlet, before ending in Lake Borgne, a shallow estuarine lake branching from the Mississippi Sound.
