= 8th Ohio Cavalry Regiment =

- Active: 1864–1865
- Country: United States of America
- Allegiance: Union
- Branch: Union Army
- Type: Cavalry
- Size: 500
- Engagements: American Civil War: Second Battle of Kernstown; Battle of Opequon; Battle of Cedar Creek; Action at Nineveh

Commanders
- Colonel: Samuel Augustus Gilbert 1864
- Colonel: Alpheus S. Moore 1864-1865
- Colonel: Wesley Owens 1865

The 8th Ohio Cavalry Regiment was a regiment of Union cavalry raised by the state of Ohio for service during the American Civil War. It served in the Eastern Theater, primarily in West Virginia and then in the Shenandoah Valley region of Virginia.

== Organization and service ==
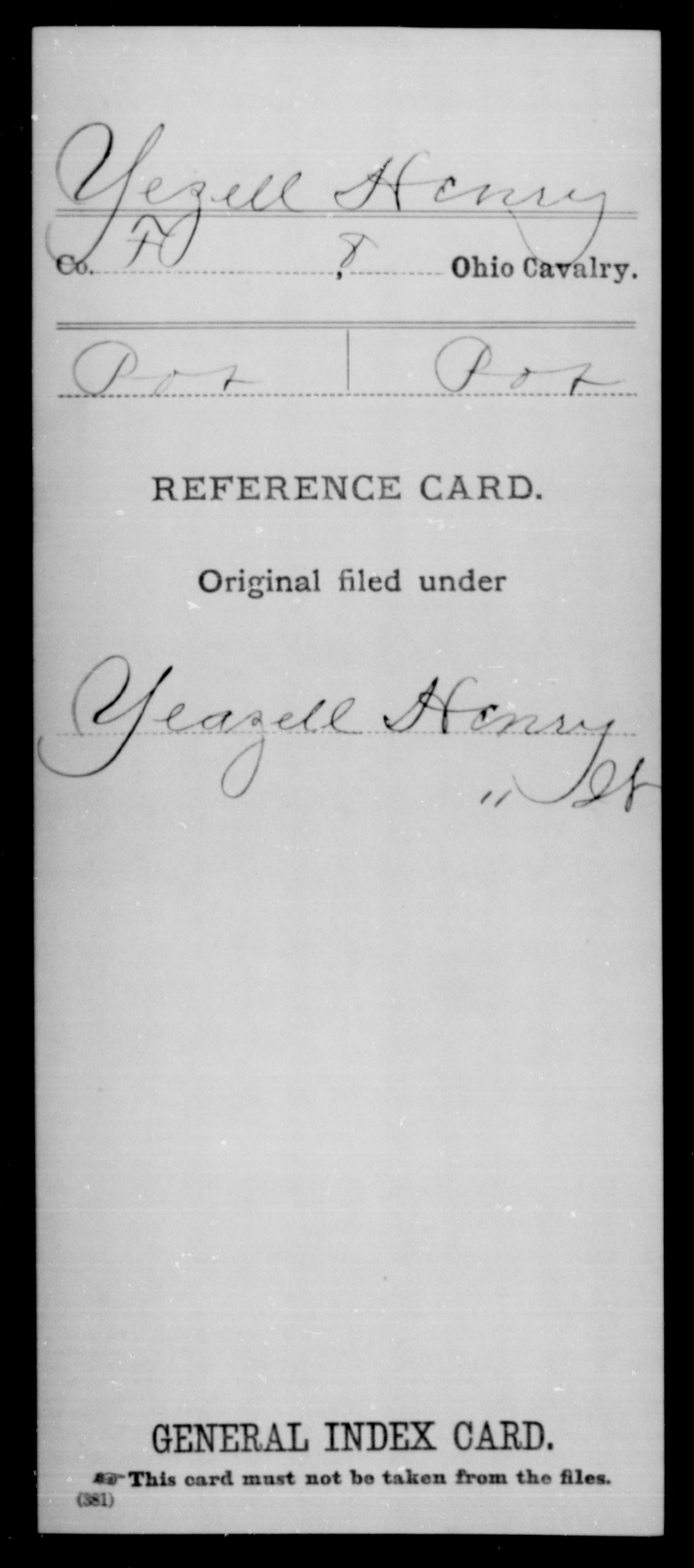
Reference card for Henry Yezell, 8th Ohio Cavalry

The 8th Ohio Cavalry Regiment was formed on January 4, 1864, from among members of the former 44th Ohio Infantry, under the command of Col. Samuel Augustus Gilbert. Organized and mustered into service in March 1864 at Camp Dennison in Cincinnati, it first served in West Virginia and was attached to 1st Brigade, 2nd Cavalry Division, Army of West Virginia. It saw considerable service during the Valley Campaigns of 1864 under Philip H. Sheridan, fighting in several key battles that led to the defeat of the Confederate Army of the Valley.

In a predawn raid on 3 Oct. 1864, Confederate Captain John McNeill led approximately 50 Confederate rangers against roughly 100 Union troopers of the 8th Ohio Cavalry Regiment guarding a Meems Bottom bridge at Mt. Jackson, Virginia, a strategic crossing of the Valley Turnpike over the North Fork of the Shenandoah River. The attack lasted just fifteen minutes with most of the detachment of the 8th Ohio Cavalry were captured but McNeill, one of the best-known and feared Confederate partisan raiders as leader of McNeill's Rangers, was mortally wounded. He was taken to a nearby house on Rude's Hill, where he was left for a period of time until his identity was subsequently discovered by Union General Sheridan's troops. He was secreted away from Rude's Hill by a small band of Confederates when the Federals had temporarily left, thinking he was too incapacitated to move and thus did not need a guard. McNeill was moved to Harrisonburg in Confederate hands, where he died on November 10

Most of the regiment was captured by the Confederates during an engagement at Beverly, West Virginia, on January 11, 1865, and those men were mustered out as prisoners of war in June 1865 and returned to Ohio. The remainder (4 companies that were on detached duty in Clarksburg, West Virginia) mustered out at the end of July.

During its term of service, the regiment (both as 44th Ohio Infantry and 8th Ohio Cavalry) lost 3 officers and 53 enlisted men killed and mortally wounded, and 1 officer and 113 enlisted men by disease (for a total of 210).
