= Battery Bienvenue =

Ruined coastal gun battery in Louisiana, USA

Coordinates: 29°59′7″N 89°52′52″W

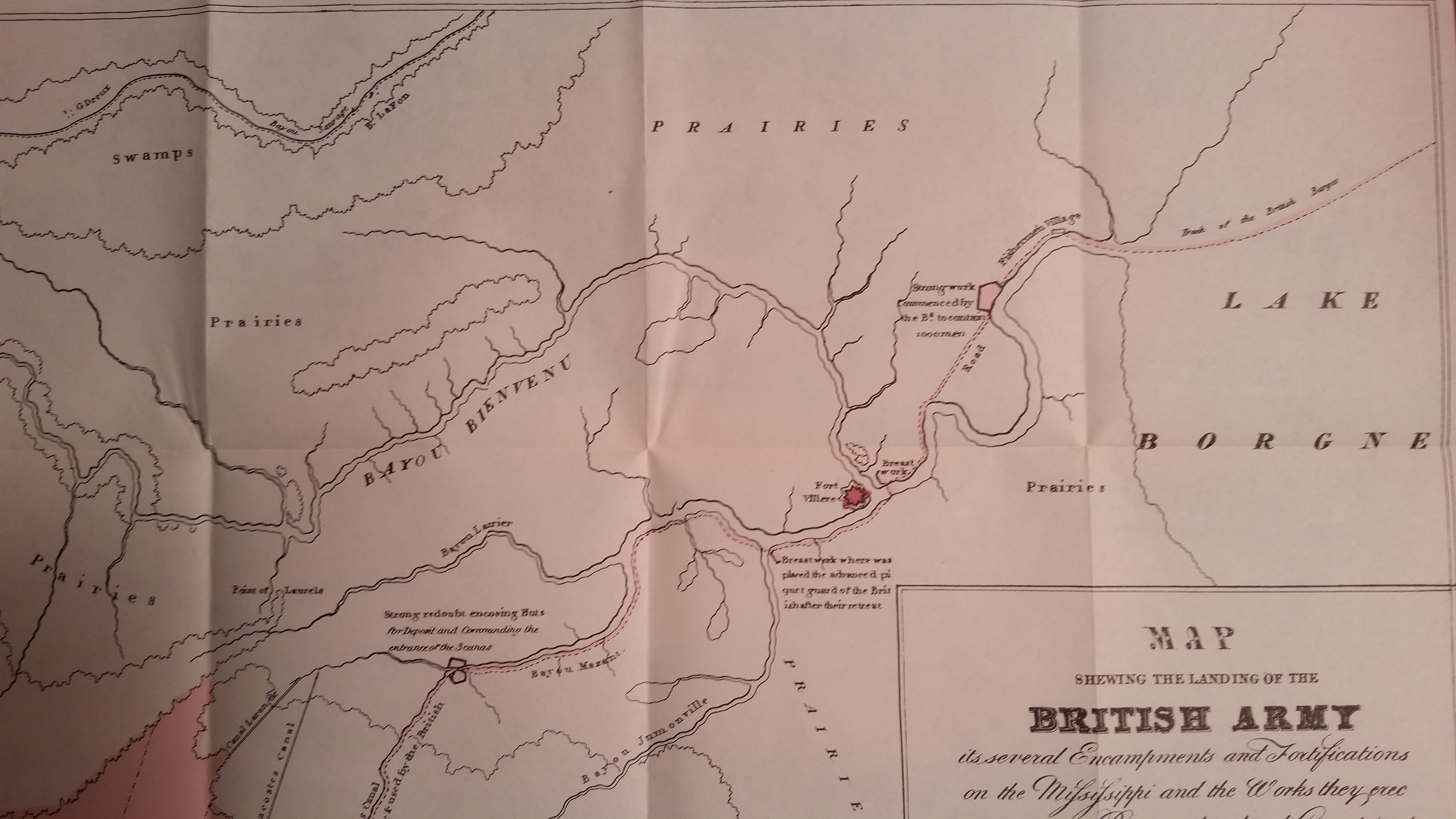
Fort Villere, center, and the track of the British barges during the War of 1812 and the Battle of New Orleans

Battery Bienvenue is a ruined coastal gun battery located in St. Bernard Parish, Louisiana. It was built as part of the harbor defense of New Orleans, and located at a strategic fork where Bayou Bienvenue and Bayou Villeré join. Bayou Bienvenue, from Lake Borgne, was the route used by the British late in 1814 to approach the city.

The battery was first constructed in 1815 and improved over the years. The initial armament was planned for one 24-pounder and two 18-pounder cannons. In 1826, the plan expanded to twenty-four 32-pounders and two 13-inch mortars with a garrison of one artillery company.

Eventually four buildings occupied the parade ground: barracks, officers quarters, a guardhouse, and an artillery magazine. The battery was about 600 feet wide, with the guns pointed toward the mouth of Bayou Bienvenue (toward Lake Borgne) and was surrounded by a moat that connected to the bayou. The battery was abandoned a few years after the American Civil War, in 1872.

== Sources ==
- Roberts, Robert B., Encyclopedia of Historic Forts: the Military, Pioneer, and Trading Posts of the United States, Macmillan, New York, 1988, 10th printing, ISBN 0-02-926880-X, page 330-331
- Weaver II, John R. (2018). A Legacy in Brick and Stone: American Coastal Defense Forts of the Third System, 1816-1867, 2nd Ed. McLean, VA: Redoubt Press. pp. 260–261. ISBN 978-1-7323916-1-1.
