= 44th Ohio Infantry Regiment =

- Active: September 12, 1861, to January 4, 1864
- Country: United States
- Allegiance: Union
- Branch: Union Army
- Type: Infantry
- Engagements: Battle of Lewisburg; Battle of Charleston; Sanders' Knoxville Raid; Battle of Cumberland Gap; Siege of Knoxville

Commanders
- Colonel: Samuel Augustus Gilbert 1861–1864

The 44th Ohio Infantry Regiment was an infantry regiment in the Union Army during the American Civil War. In early 1864, the regiment was reorganized into the 8th Ohio Cavalry Regiment.

== Service ==
The 44th Ohio Infantry Regiment was organized in Springfield, Ohio September 12 through October 14, 1861, and mustered in for three years service under the command of Colonel Samuel Augustus Gilbert.

The regiment was attached to Benham's Brigade, District of the Kanawha, West Virginia, October 1861. 1st Brigade, District of the Kanawha, West Virginia, to March 1862. 3rd Brigade, Kanawha Division, West Virginia, to September 1862. 2nd Brigade, 2nd Division, Army of Kentucky, Department of the Ohio, to January 1863. 1st Brigade, District of Central Kentucky, Department of the Ohio, to June 1863. 2nd Brigade, 1st Division, XXIII Corps, Department of the Ohio, to July 1863. 2nd Brigade, 4th Division, XXIII Corps, to August 1863. 1st Brigade, 3rd Division, XXIII Corps, to January 1864.

The 44th Ohio Infantry ceased to exist on January 4, 1864, when its designation was changed to the 8th Ohio Cavalry.

== Detailed service ==
Ordered to Camp Platt, Va., October 14. Operations in the Kanawha Valley and New River Region, Virginia, October 19-November 16, 1861. Duty at Camp Platt, Va., until May 1862. Action at Chapmansville April 18. Moved to Gauley Bridge May 1. Expedition to Lewisburg and Jackson River Depot May 12–23. Jackson River Depot May 20. Action at Lewisburg May 23. Moved to Meadow Bluffs May 29, and duty there until August. Expedition to Salt Sulphur Springs June 22–25. Scout from Meadow Bluffs to Greenbrier River August 2–5 (Companies F, G, and K). Greenbrier River August 3. Near Cannelton September 1. Campaign in the Kanawha Valley September 6–16. Camp Tompkins September 9. Miller's Ferry and Gauley Bridge September 11. Near Cannelton September 12. Charleston September 13. Point Pleasant September 20. Ordered to Covington, Ky., September 27. Brookville September 28. Moved to Lexington, Ky., October 6. To Richmond December 1, then to Danville, Ky., December 20. Regiment mounted at Frankfort, Ky. Operations in central Kentucky against Cluke's forces February 18-March 5, 1863. Action at Slate Creek, near Mt. Sterling, February 24. Stoner's Bridge February 24. Hazel Green March 9 and 19. Operations against Pegram March 22-April 1. Hickman's Bridge March 28. Dutton's Hill, Somerset, March 30. Expedition to Monticello and operations in southeastern Kentucky April 26-May 12. Barbourville April 27. Monticello May 1. Saunder's Raid into eastern Tennessee June 14–24. Pine Mountain June 16. Big Creek Gap June 17. Knoxville June 19–20. Strawberry Plains, Rogers' Gap and Powder Springs Gap, June 20. Williams' Gap and Powell Valley June 22. Rogers' Gap June 26. Operations against Scott July 22–27. Williamsburg July 25 (detachment). London July 26. Richmond and Manchester Cross Roads July 27. Burnside's Campaign in eastern Tennessee August 16-October 17. Expedition to Cumberland Gap September 4–7. Operations about Cumberland Gap September 7–10. Cumberland Iron Works September 23. Blue Springs October 10. Knoxville Campaign November 4-December 23. Siege of Knoxville November 17-December 5. Bean's Station December 14.

== Casualties ==
The regiment lost a total of 210 men during service; 3 officers and 53 enlisted men killed or mortally wounded, 1 officer and 113 enlisted men died of disease. [Note: These losses include those after the regiment's designation was changed to the 8th Ohio Cavalry.]

== See also ==
- 8th Ohio Cavalry
- List of Ohio Civil War units
- Ohio in the Civil War
