= 105th Ohio Infantry Regiment =

- Active: August 20, 1862, to June 3, 1865
- Country: United States
- Allegiance: Union
- Branch: Infantry
- Engagements: Battle of Perryville; Tullahoma Campaign; Battle of Chickamauga; Siege of Chattanooga; Battle of Missionary Ridge; Atlanta campaign; Battle of Resaca; Battle of Kennesaw Mountain; Battle of Peachtree Creek; Siege of Atlanta; Battle of Jonesborough; Sherman's March to the Sea; Carolinas campaign; Battle of Bentonville

Commanders
- Notable commanders: Albert Sereno Hall

The 105th Ohio Infantry Regiment, sometimes 105th Ohio Volunteer Infantry (or 105th OVI) was an infantry regiment in the Union Army during the American Civil War.

== Service ==
The 105th Ohio Infantry was organized at Cleveland, Ohio, and mustered in for three years service on August 20, 1862, under the command of Colonel Albert S. Hall. The regiment was recruited in northeastern Ohio counties.

The regiment was attached to 33rd Brigade, 10th Division, Army of the Ohio, to September 1862. 33rd Brigade, 10th Division, II Corps, Army of the Ohio, to November 1862. 1st Brigade, 5th Division, Center, XIV Corps, Army of the Cumberland, to January 1863. 1st Brigade, 5th Division, XIV Corps, Army of the Cumberland, to June 1863. 2nd Brigade, 4th Division, XIV Corps, to October 1863. 2nd Brigade, 3rd Division, XIV Corps, to July 1865.

The 105th Ohio Infantry mustered out of service at Washington, D.C., on June 3, 1865.

== Detailed service ==
Ordered to Covington, Ky., August 21, 1862; thence to Lexington, Ky., August 25. March to relief of Nelson August 30. Retreat to Louisville, Ky., September 1–15. Pursuit of Bragg into Kentucky October 1–12. Battle of Perryville, Ky., October 8. March to Munfordville, Ky., October 12, and duty there until November 30. Expedition to Cave City October 31 and November 26. Moved to Bledsoe Creek November 30. Operations against Morgan December 22, 1862, to January 2, 1863. March to Nashville, Tenn., thence to Murfreesboro January 3–11, and duty there until June. Expedition to Auburn, Liberty and Alexandria February 3–5. Expedition to Woodbury March 3–8. Vaught's Hill, near Milton, March 20. Expedition to McMinnville April 20–30. Tullahoma Campaign June 23-July 7. Hoover's Gap June 24–26. Occupation of middle Tennessee until August 16. Passage of the Cumberland Mountains and Tennessee River and Chickamauga Campaign August 16-September 22. Shellmound August 21. Reconnaissance toward Chattanooga August 30–31. Battle of Chickamauga September 19–21. Siege of Chattanooga, September 24-November 23. Chattanooga-Ringgold Campaign November 23–27. Orchard Knob November 23–24. Missionary Ridge November 25. Demonstrations on Dalton, Ga., February 22–27, 1864. Tunnel Hill, Buzzard's Roost Gap and Rocky Faced Ridge February 23–25. Reconnaissance from Ringgold toward Tunnel Hill April 29. Atlanta Campaign May 1 to September 8. Demonstrations on Rocky Faced Ridge May 8–11. Battle of Resaca May 14–15. Advance on Dallas May 18–25. Operations on line of Pumpkin Vine Creek and battles about Dallas, New Hope Church and Allatoona Hills May 25-June 5. Operations about Marietta and against Kennesaw June 10-July 2. Pine Hill June 11–14. Lost Mountain June 15–17. Assault on Kennesaw June 27. Ruff's Station July 4. Chattahoochie River July 5–17. Peachtree Creek July 19–20. Siege of Atlanta July 22-August 25. Utoy Creek August 5–7. Flank movement on Jonesboro August 25–30. Battle of Jonesboro August 31-September 1. Operations against Hood in northern Georgia and northern Alabama September 29-November 3. March to the Sea November 15-December 10. Siege of Savannah December 10–15. Campaign of the Carolinas January to April, 1865. Fayetteville, N. C., March 11. Battle of Bentonville March 19–21. Occupation of Goldsboro March 24. Advance on Raleigh April 10–14. Occupation of Raleigh April 14. Bennett's House April 26. Surrender of Johnston and his army. March to Washington, D.C., via Richmond, Va., April 29-May 20. Washington, D.C., for the Grand Review of the Armies May 24.

== Casualties ==
The regiment lost a total of 240 men during service; 3 officers and 104 enlisted men killed or mortally wounded, 7 officers and 126 enlisted men died of disease.

== Commanders ==
- Colonel Albert Sereno Hall – died of disease, July 10, 1863
- Colonel William R. Tolles – resigned January 28, 1864
- Lieutenant Colonel George T. Perkins – commanded at the battle of Chickamauga as a major

== Notable members ==
- Lieutenant Albion W. Tourgée, Company G – jurist, novelist, and diplomat

== See also ==
- List of Ohio Civil War units
- Ohio in the Civil War
