= Milton, Tennessee =

- Town
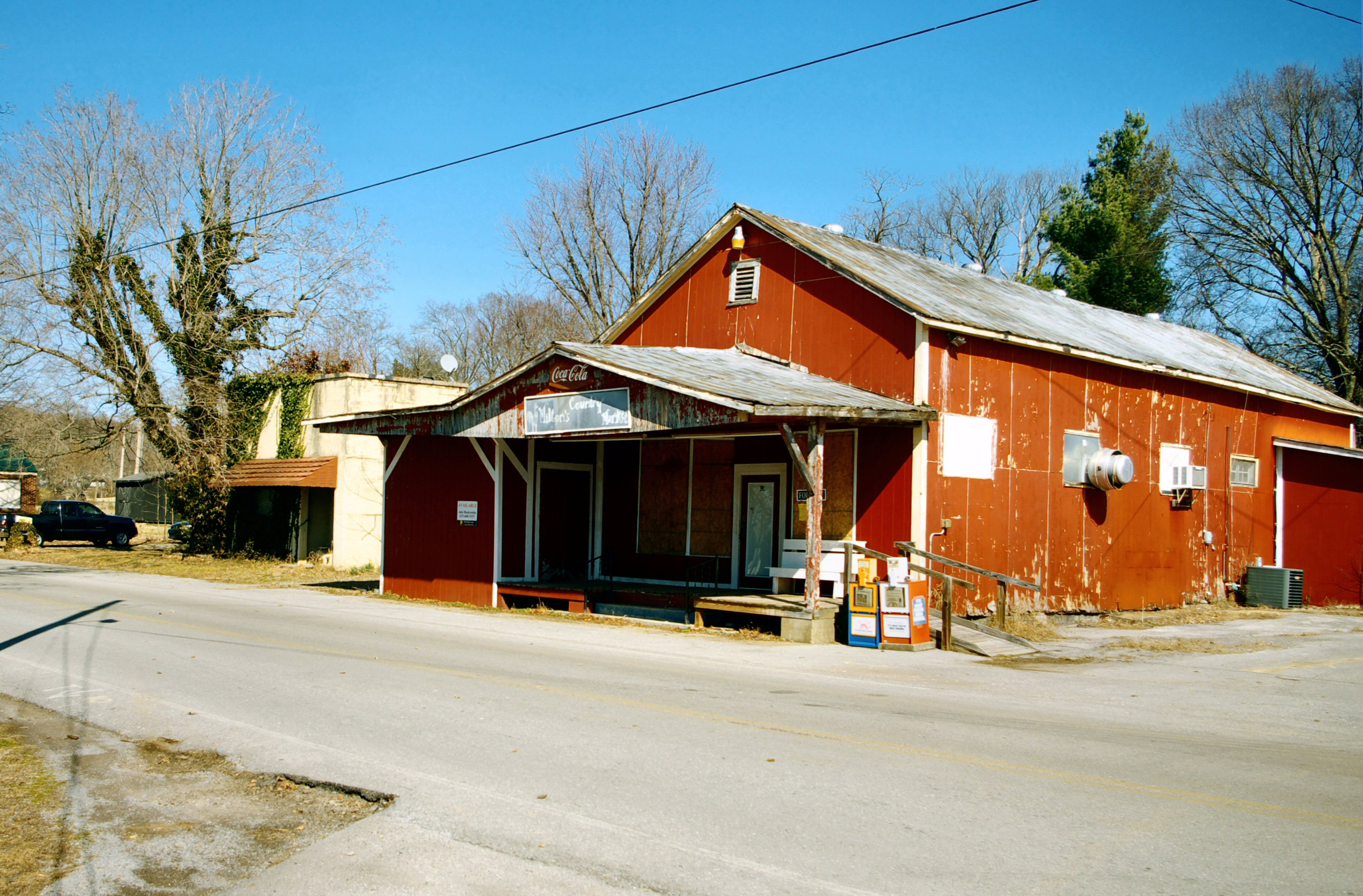

- Location within Tennessee Location within the United States
- Coordinates: 35°55′47″N 86°10′54″W
- Country: United States
- State: Tennessee
- County: Rutherford
- Elevation: 745 ft (227 m)
- Time zone: UTC−6 (Central (CST))
  - Summer (DST): UTC−5 (CDT)
- ZIP Code: 37118
- Area code: 615
- GNIS feature ID: 1294012

Milton is an unincorporated community in Rutherford County, Tennessee, United States. Its ZIP Code is 37118. The community is concentrated in the northeast corner of the county along State Route 96 (Lascassas Pike) between Auburntown and Murfreesboro.

Milton was established by early-19th-century entrepreneur Gideon Thompson in 1820. Milton once was incorporated.
