= Battle of Greenbrier River =

1861 battle of the American Civil War

- Part of the American Civil War
Date	October 3, 1861 (164 years ago)
Location	Pocahontas County, Virginia (present-day West Virginia) 38°32′03″N 79°46′04″W
Result	Inconclusive

Belligerents
Union	Confederate

Commanders and leaders
Brig. Gen. Joseph Reynolds	Brig. Gen. Henry Jackson

Strength
5,000	1,800

Casualties and losses
8 killed 35 wounded	6 killed 33 wounded 13 missing
- Location within West Virginia

The Battle of Greenbrier River, also known as the Battle of Camp Bartow, took place on October 3, 1861 in Pocahontas County, Virginia (present-day West Virginia) as part of the Western Virginia Campaign of the American Civil War.

== Background ==
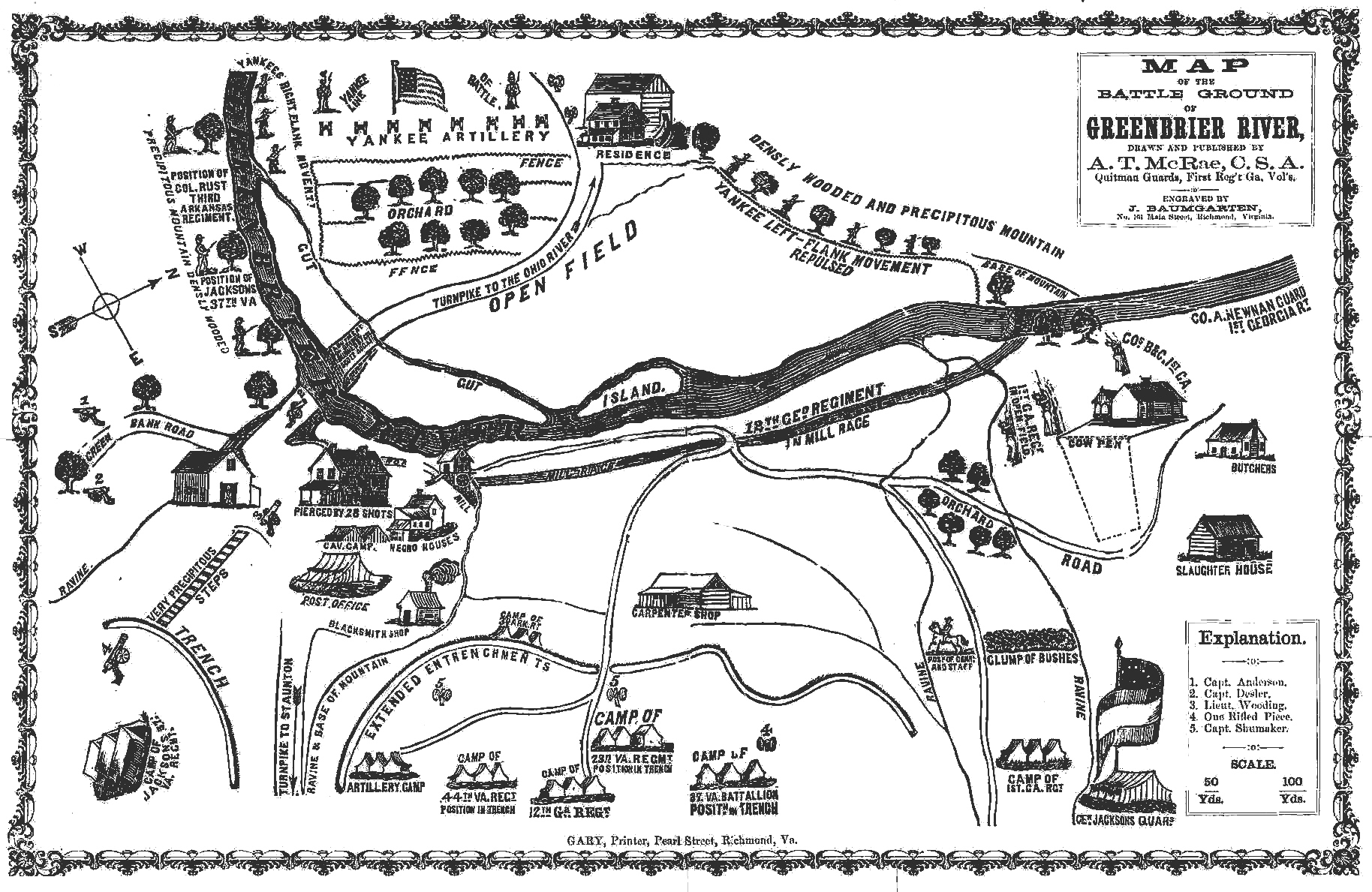
A map of the battle, drawn by A.T. McRae of the Quitman Guards, 1st Regiment Georgia Volunteers

In mid-September 1861 Confederate troops established Camp Bartow in the Cheat Mountain Area. The Confederates had the advantage of knowing the land but their numbers were greatly reduced due to sickness. Colonel William Taliaferro had reported that his army had been reduced to one-third strength.

Controlling the Union forces in Cheat Mountain and Tygart's Valley was Brigadier General Joseph Reynolds. Reynolds’ army's spirits had been heartened due to their success in repelling General William W. Loring's troops. Reynolds believed that he would be able to defeat the Confederates and clear the mountain for a quick route to Virginia. For two days it rained non-stop and due to the cold weather both troops lost men.

== Opposing forces ==
=== Union ===
Reynolds' army was composed of the 24th, 25th, and 32nd Ohio Infantry; the 7th, 9th, 13th, 14th, 15th, and 17th Indiana Infantry; Battery G, 4th U.S. Artillery, commanded by Captain Albion Howe; Loomis' Battery; Battery A, 1st West Virginia Light Artillery Regiment; and parts of Robinson's Ohio Cavalry; Greenfield's Pennsylvania Cavalry, and Bracken's Independent Company Indiana Cavalry, Company K, 1st Indiana Cavalry. Reynolds had about 5,000 men of different arms, infantry, cavalry and artillery.

=== Confederate ===
The Confederate force was composed of the 1st Georgia Infantry (Ramsey's) and the 12th Georgia Infantry under Colonel Edward Johnson; the 23d, 44th, and a battalion of the 25th Virginia Infantry under Lieutenant Colonel George Hansbrough; the 3d Arkansas Infantry under Colonel Albert Rust; the 31st Virginia Infantry, Anderson's, and Shumaker's Batteries, and a part of the Churchville Cavalry from Augusta County under Captain Franklin Sterrett. And about nine miles away, the 52d Virginia Infantry under Colonel John Baldwin.

== Battle ==
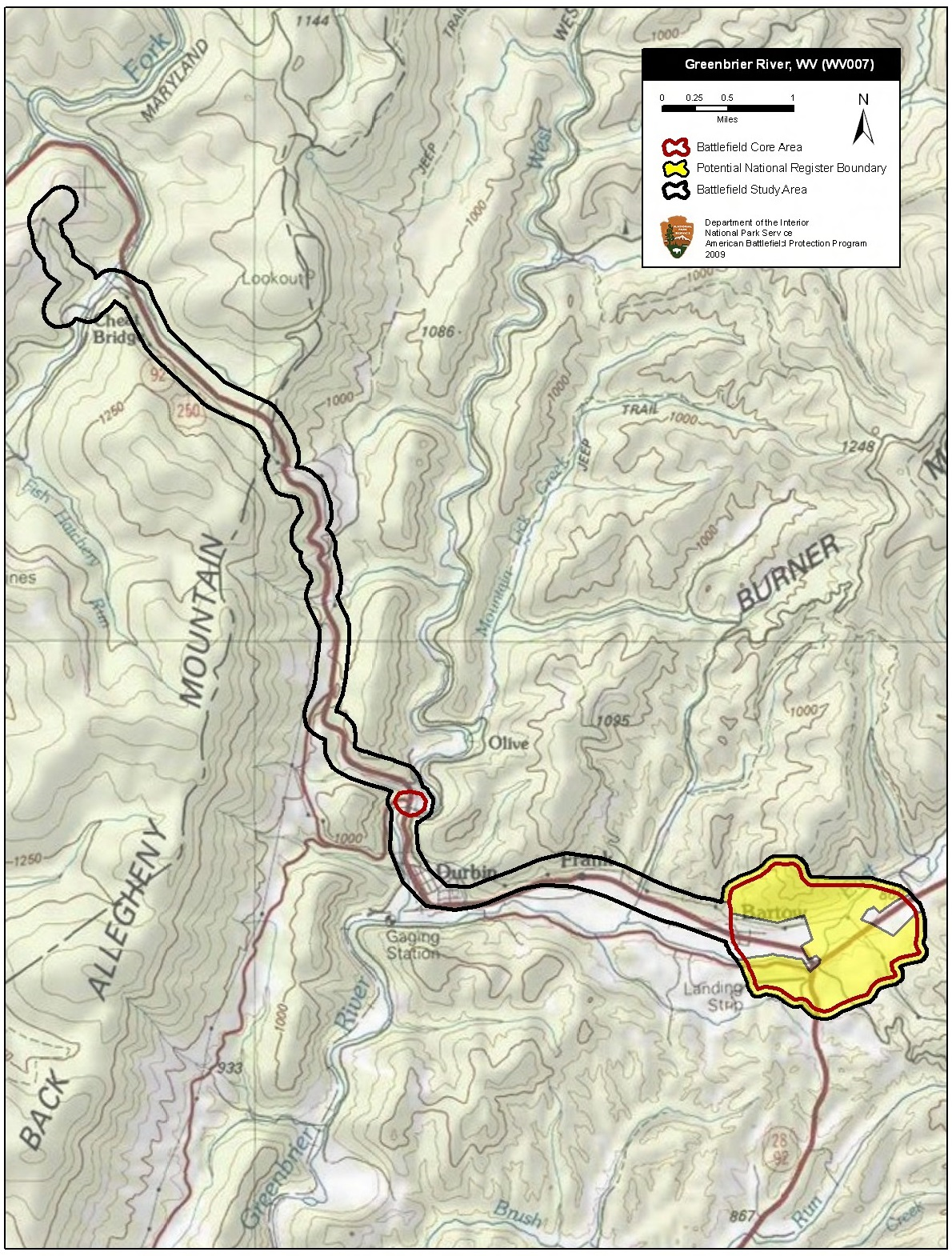
Map of Greenbrier River Battlefield core and study areas by the American Battlefield Protection Program

Reynolds troops began to move at midnight on October 2, 1861 and by daylight they entered Greenbrier, roughly four miles from the Confederate camp.

At 8 o’clock in the morning the Confederate soldiers guarding the camp left their posts and the Union soldiers entered the Confederate camp. Upon opening fire, the Confederate Army was having trouble working their weapons and while they were trying to fix them they were forced to move out into the open due to the Union armies significant firepower.

When Colonel John Brown Baldwin, who was in charge of the 52nd Virginia Infantry, heard the gunshots he immediately left camp with all of his men and went to help the Confederates. By the time they reached the battlefield they thought it was too late, but when the Union army saw more men coming they continued to fire and the battle continued for approximately five more hours. Reynolds ordered his troops to return to Cheat Mountain breaking off the battle.

== Aftermath ==
After the battle was finished, both sides realized the losses were not great. In an attempt to appear superior, both the Union and the Confederates increased the enemies losses and both reported that they had lost around 300 men. When the results were calculated the Union had eight men killed and thirty-five men wounded. The Confederates had lost six men, had thirty-three wounded, and thirteen men missing. The result of the Battle of Greenbrier River was inconclusive.

== Battlefield preservation ==
The Staunton-Parkersburg Turnpike Alliance received a $46,000 grant from the National Park Service to develop community consensus and a preservation plan for the future of the Greenbrier River/Camp Bartow site. The preservation partner will seek community support for this plan, and will address the future of the Camp Bartow Historic District.

In the fall of 2016, in conjunction with the American Battlefield Trust and its partners, the West Virginia Land Trust acquired 14 acres (5.7 ha) that preserve the core of the battlefield. The organization plans to develop public access to the site in 2018.

== See also ==
- Camp Bartow Historic District
- List of American Civil War battles
- Troop engagements of the American Civil War, 1861
