= Battle of Rich Mountain order of battle =

The following is the organization of the Union and Confederate forces engaged at the Battle of Rich Mountain, during the American Civil War in 1861.

== Abbreviations used ==
Military Rank

- Gen = General
- LTG = Lieutenant General
- MG = Major General
- BG = Brigadier General
- Col = Colonel
- Ltc = Lieutenant Colonel
- Maj = Major
- Cpt = Captain
- Lt = Lieutenant

Other

- w = wounded
- mw = mortally wounded
- k = killed
- m = missing

== Union forces ==
Department of the Ohio (Army of Occupation): MG George B. McClellan

Union forces
	Brigades	Regiments
Rich Mountain; MG George B. McClellan
Rich Mountain; MG George B. McClellan	Schleich's Brigade BG Newton Schleich	3rd Ohio: Col Isaac H. Morrow; 6th Ohio: Col William K. Bosley; 14th Indiana: Col Nathan Kimball; 15th Indiana: Col George D. Wagner
Rich Mountain; MG George B. McClellan	Rosecrans' Brigade BG William S. Rosecrans	17th Ohio: Col John M. Connel; 19th Ohio: Col Samuel Beatty; 8th Indiana: Col William P. Benton; 10th Indiana: Col Mahlon D. Manson; 13th Indiana: Col Jeremiah C. Sullivan; Independent Company, Ohio Cavalry: Cpt Henry W. Burdsal; 4th U.S. Artillery, Battery G: Cpt Albion P. Howe; 4th U.S. Artillery, Battery I: Cpt Oscar A. Mack
Rich Mountain; MG George B. McClellan	McCook's Advance Brigade Col Robert L. McCook	4th Ohio: Col Lorin Andrews; 9th Ohio: Col Robert L. McCook; 1st Michigan Artillery, Battery A: Lt George Van Pelt
Laurel Hill; BG Thomas A. Morris
Laurel Hill; BG Thomas A. Morris	Morris' "Indiana" Brigade BG Thomas A. Morris	6th Indiana: Col Thomas Turpin Crittenden; 7th Indiana: Col Ebenezer Dumont; 9th Indiana: Col Robert H. Milroy; 1st Ohio Light Artillery, Detachment: Col James Barnett
Laurel Hill; BG Thomas A. Morris	Hill's Brigade BG Charles W. Hill	8th Ohio: Col Herman G. Depuy; 15th Ohio: Col George W. Andrews; 16th Ohio: Col James Irvine

== Confederate forces ==
Army of the Northwest: BG Robert S. Garnett

Confederate forces
	Regiments
Laurel Hill BG Robert S. Garnett	1st Georgia: Col James N. Ramsey; 9th Battalion, Virginia Infantry: Maj George W. Hansborough; 23rd Virginia: Col William B. Taliaferro; 31st Virginia: Ltc William L. Jackson; 37th Virginia: Col Samuel V. Fulkerson; Danville Artillery: Cpt Lindsay M. Shumaker; Smith's Cavalry Squadron: Cpt John G. Smith; Jackson's Cavalry Squadron: Cpt George Jackson
Rich Mountain Ltc John Pegram	20th Virginia: Capt. Julius A. De Lagnel; 25th Virginia: Ltc Jonathan M. Heck; 44th Virginia: Col William C. Scott; 14th Virginia Cavalry, Company I: Cpt Franklin F. Sterrett; Lee Battery: Cpt Pierce B. Anderson
