= Troop engagements of the American Civil War, 1861 =

Years
1861
1862
1863
1864
1865
or return to the main page.

The following is a list of engagements that took place in 1861 during the American Civil War.

== History ==
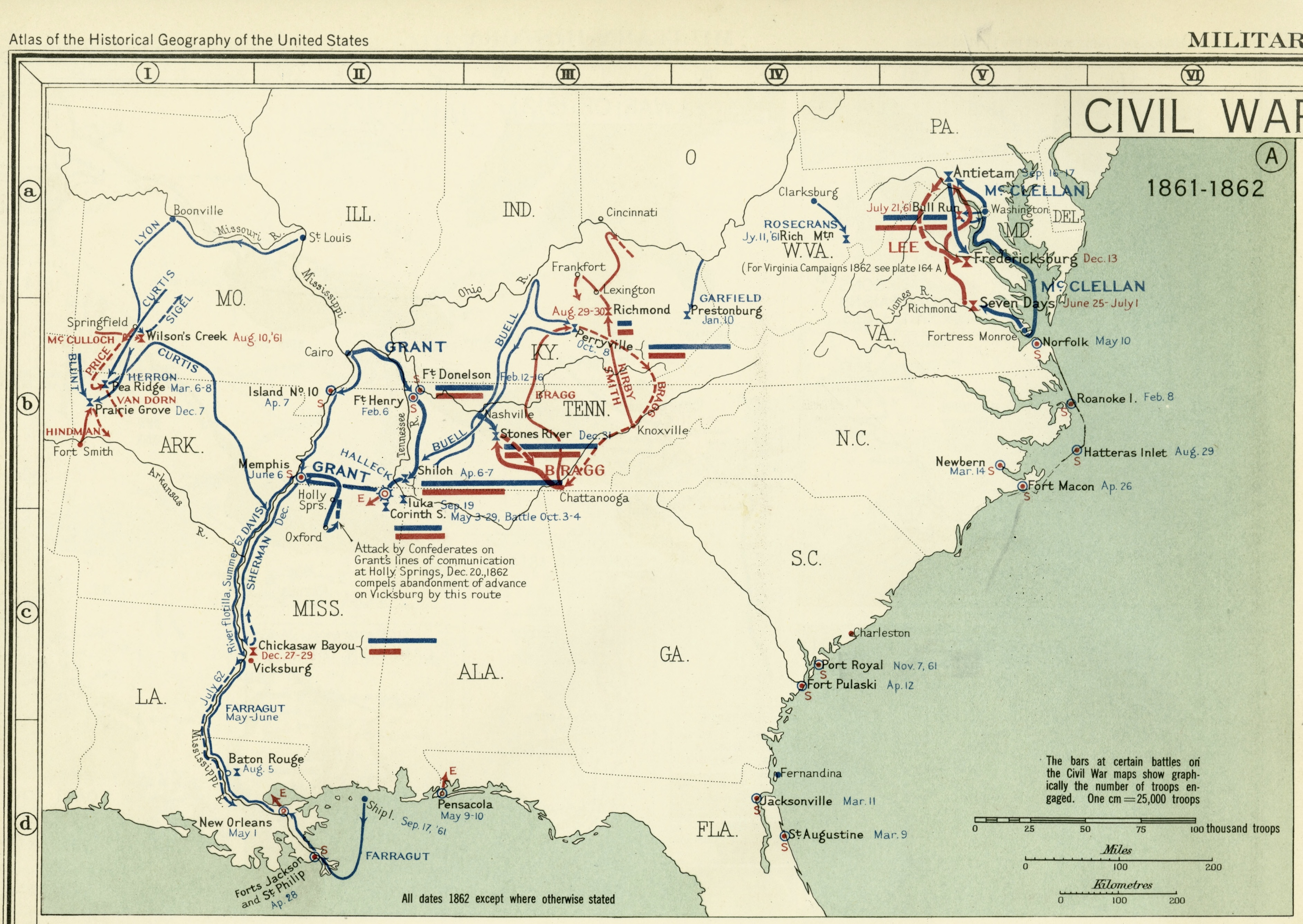
The American Civil War in 1861-1862.

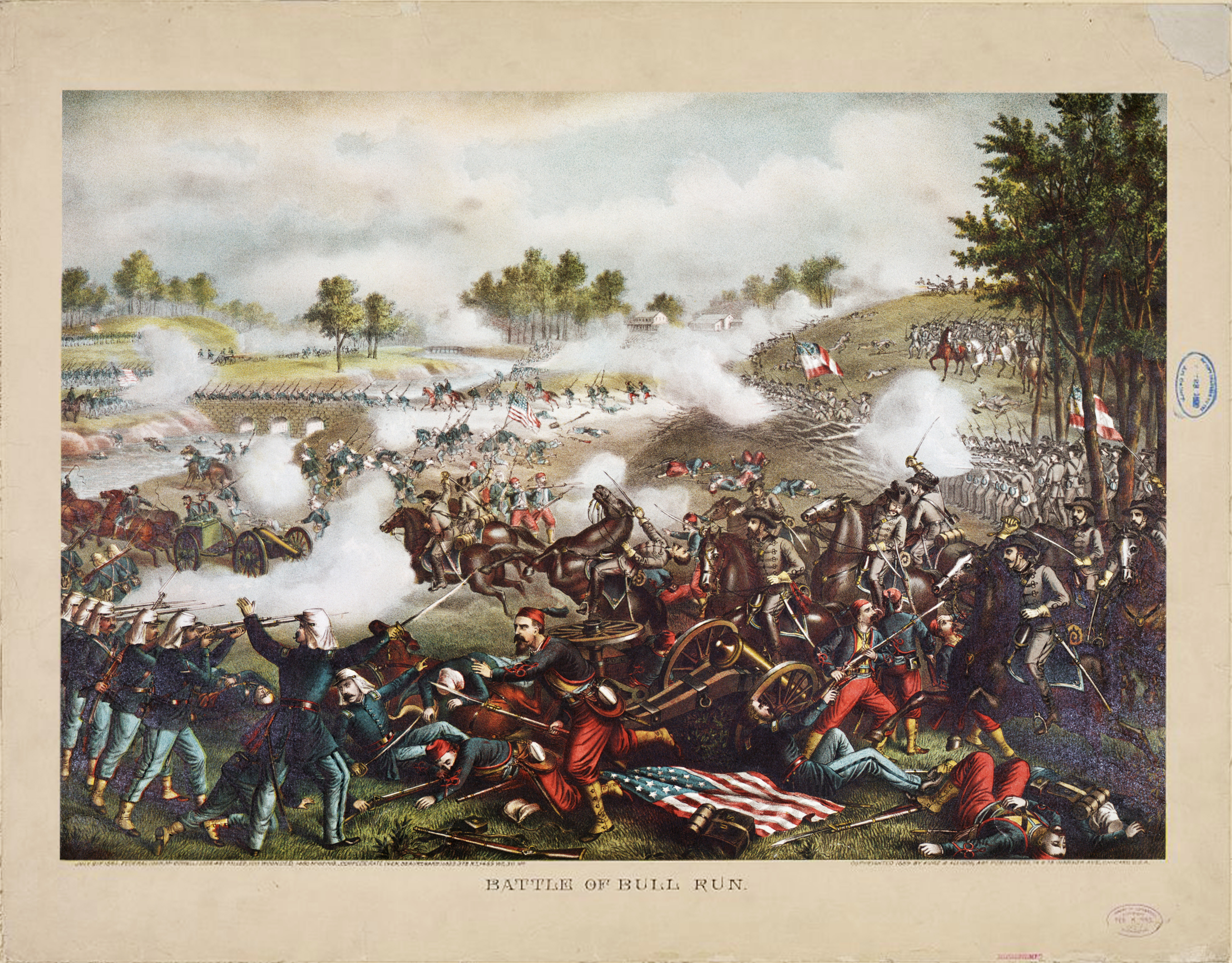
First Battle of Bull Run, chromolitograph by Kurz & Allison

The war started on April 12 when Confederate forces commanded by General P. G. T. Beauregard opened fire on the Union garrison of Fort Sumter in the harbor of Charleston, South Carolina; after a thirty-four-hour bombardment, the Union garrison surrendered. There had been no casualties during the bombardment; but the following day while the Union garrison commander, Major Robert Anderson, was firing a fifty-gun salute, there was an explosion that resulted in one man being killed and five wounded. United States president Abraham Lincoln issued a proclamation calling for the states to raise 75,000 volunteers for ninety days to suppress the South; in response to the proclamation, an additional four states (Virginia, Arkansas, Tennessee, and North Carolina) seceded and joined the Confederacy, pledging troops to the volunteer forces it was raising.

In the Eastern Theater, there were two major campaigns in Virginia. The first, the Western Virginia Campaign, started in May. Union forces commanded by Major General George B. McClellan invaded western Virginia and drove the Confederate forces from the area following a series of small skirmishes. Although these fights involved only a few hundred men on either side, the newspaper coverage of the campaign turned McClellan into a national hero. After McClellan was transferred to command the Army of the Potomac, Confederate General Robert E. Lee was assigned to drive the Union forces out of the state but failed to do so at Cheat Mountain and in the Kanawha Valley; Lee was subsequently transferred to other duties in November. The other major campaign ended with the First Battle of Bull Run on July 17, when Union forces commanded by Major General Irvin McDowell attacked the Confederate Army of the Potomac, commanded by Brigadier General P.G.T. Beauregard; although initially successful, Confederate reinforcements from the Shenandoah Valley routed McDowell and forced him back to Washington, D.C. McDowell was replaced by McClellan, who renamed his force the Army of the Potomac and spent the rest of the year training his men and stockpiling supplies, despite pressure from the Union government to launch an offensive as soon as possible. There were several minor skirmishes in Virginia during the remainder of the year, the most significant being the Battle of Ball's Bluff, due to the death of Colonel Edward Baker, a senator from Oregon. Outrage in Congress over his death led to the creation of the Joint Committee on the Conduct of the War, which was used by the Radical Republicans in Congress in an attempt to prosecute the war according to their views.

In the Western Theater, there were several skirmishes in the border southern state of Kentucky but no major battles. Kentucky, with divided sympathies, attempted to declare itself neutral; however, Confederate Major General Leonidas Polk sent a force to occupy Columbus, Kentucky, saying it was necessary for the defense of the Mississippi River. The Kentucky legislature then requested Union help in driving the Confederates out of the state, at which point both armies set up defensive positions all through the state. Most of the legislature were Unionists, but a pro-Confederate state government, with some members of the legislature and delegates sent by 68 Kentucky Counties was organized in the Russellville Convention forming the Confederate government of Kentucky and bringing more than half of Kentucky under Confederate control; both armies then began recruiting efforts. Along the Atlantic seacoast and Gulf coast, Union forces captured several coastal areas for use as naval ports for the Union blockade, including Port Royal, South Carolina and the Outer Banks of North Carolina. Lincoln declared on April 19 a blockade of the Confederate coastline and ports; this required the Union navy to build hundreds of ships to enforce the blockade, growing from forty-two ships in April to a total of 264 ships at the end of the year.

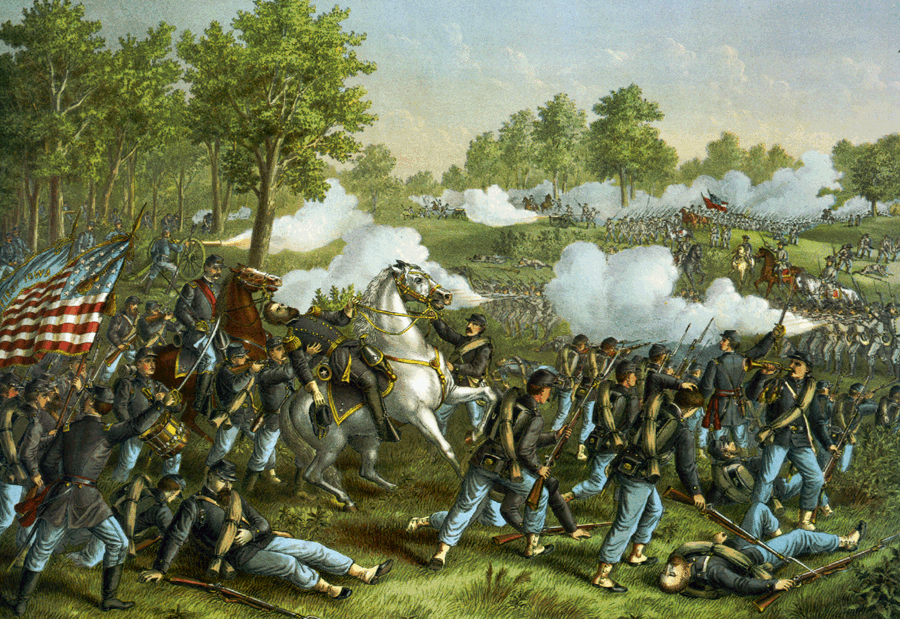
Battle of Wilson's Creek by Kurz and Allison

In the Trans-Mississippi Theater, most of the fighting took place in Missouri between the pro-secessionist Missouri State Guard, commanded by Major General Sterling Price, and the Union Department of the West. Union forces under the command of Brigadier General Nathaniel Lyon drove the Missouri State Guard and the pro-secessionist portion of the state government into the southwestern part of the state, where it united with the Confederate Western Army commanded by Brigadier General Benjamin McCulloch. There, on August 10 in the Battle of Wilson's Creek, Lyon attacked the combined forces of Price and McCulloch and was defeated, with Lyon being killed during the battle. McCulloch returned to Arkansas, while Price moved north, attempting to recapture the state from Union forces. Another Confederate offensive took place in the New Mexico Territory, where a Confederate cavalry battalion moved into the southwestern part of the territory and captured Fort Filmore, forcing the surrender of the Union garrison. A secessionist convention in Mesilla declared the southern portion of the territory to be the Confederate Territory of Arizona and raised several militia companies, which fought several skirmishes with both the Union forces remaining in the territory and the Apache tribes.

== Engagements ==
Date	Engagement	Military units	Losses	Victor (if applicable)
April 12–14	Fort Sumter, South Carolina	Confederate artillery, Union garrison of Fort Sumter	None	CSA
April 15	Evacuation of Fort Sumter, South Carolina	Union garrison of Fort Sumter	Union One soldier was killed and five others wounded by a premature explosion of a cannon in firing a salute to the United States flag.	USA
April 19	Riots in Baltimore, Maryland	Union 6th Regiment Massachusetts Volunteer Militia, 26th Pennsylvania Infantry, pro-secessionist crowd	Union 34; civilians 4 killed, unknown wounded	USA
May 10	Camp Jackson, located just west of St. Louis, Missouri	Missouri State Guard, Union Department of the West	Missouri State Guard 639 (all prisoners), Union none	USA
May 10	Riots in St. Louis, Missouri	Union forces and pro-secessionist crowd	Union 4 killed, prisoners 3 killed, civilians 28 killed (unknown wounded)	USA
May 18–19	Sewell's Point, Virginia	Confederate artillery, Union naval squadron	10 total	Inconclusive
May 29 – June 1	Aquia Creek, Virginia	Confederate artillery, Union naval squadron	10 total	Inconclusive
June 1	Fairfax Court House, Virginia	detachments from Confederate Army of the Potomac and Union Department of Northeastern Virginia	Confederate 1 killed, 2 wounded, 5 captured, Union 1 killed, 4 wounded, 3 captured	Inconclusive
June 1	Arlington Mills, Virginia	small Confederate infantry squad; two Union infantry companies	Confederate 1 wounded; Union 1 killed, 1 wounded	Inconclusive
June 3	Philippi, West Virginia	Confederate infantry, Union Department of the Ohio	Confederate 6, Union 5	USA
June 10	Big Bethel, Virginia	Confederate and Union infantry	Confederate 8, Union 76	CSA
June 17	Vienna, Virginia	Detachments from Confederate Army of the Potomac and Union Department of Northeastern Virginia	Confederate none reported, Union 8 killed, 4 wounded	CSA
June 17	Boonville, Missouri	Missouri State Guard, Union Western Department	Missouri State Guard 70, Union 12	USA
June 18	Camp Cole, Missouri	Missouri State Guards, Union Missouri Home Guards.	Missouri State Guard 32, Union 125	CSA
June 27	Matthias' Point, Virginia	Confederate garrison, Union gunboats Pawnee and Freeborn.	Confederate none, Union 5	CSA
June 29	Bowman's Place, West Virginia	Confederate irregulars and Union infantry	Confederate 4, Union 2	USA
July 2	Hoke's Run, West Virginia	Confederate Army of the Shenandoah, Union Army of the Shenandoah	Confederate 25, Union 73	USA
July 5	Carthage, Missouri	Missouri State Guard, Union Department of the West	Missouri State Guard 74, Union 44	CSA
July 5	Neosho, Missouri	Confederate cavalry, Union detachment of 3rd Missouri Infantry	Confederate none, Union 137 (captured)	CSA
July 8	Laurel Hill or Belington, West Virginia	Confederate Army of the Northwest, Union Department of the Ohio	Confederate unknown, Union 8	USA
July 11	Rich Mountain, West Virginia	Confederate infantry, Union Department of the Ohio	Confederate 88, Union 74	USA
July 12	Cedar Lane Virginia Peninsula	Confederate cavalry, Union infantry	Confederate 0, Union 20+	CSA
July 13	Corrick's Ford, West Virginia	Confederate Infantry, Union Department of the Ohio	Confederate 620, Union 10–53	USA
July 12	Barboursville or Red House, Virginia	Confederate infantry, Union Department of the Ohio	unknown	USA
July 12	Beverly, West Virginia	Confederate Army of the Northwest, Union Department of the Ohio	Confederate 553 (prisoners), Union none	USA
July 14	Corrick's Ford, West Virginia	Confederate infantry, Union Department of the Ohio	Confederate 620, Union 10–53	USA
July 17	Scary Creek, West Virginia	Confederate Army of the Kanawha, Union Department of the Ohio	Confederate 10, Union 47	CSA
July 17	Bunker Hill, Virginia	Confederate Army of the Shenandoah, Union Army of the Shenandoah	unknown	CSA?
July 18	Blackburn's Ford, Virginia	Confederate Army of the Potomac, Union Department of Northeast Virginia	Confederate 70, Union 83	CSA
July 21	Manassas, Virginia	Confederate Army of the Potomac and Army of the Shenandoah, Union Department of Northeast Virginia	Confederate 1,897, Union 2,708	CSA
July 22	Forsyth, Missouri	Missouri State Guard, Union Department of the West	Missouri State Guard 15, Union 3	USA
July 26	Mesilla, New Mexico Territory	Confederate battalion from 2nd Texas Mounted Rifles, Union Southern Military District, Department of New Mexico	Confederate none, Union 9	CSA
July 27	Fort Fillmore, New Mexico	Confederate battalion from 2nd Texas Mounted Rifles, Union Southern Military District, Department of New Mexico	Confederate none, Union 500 (surrendered)	CSA
August 2	Dug Springs, Missouri	Missouri State Guard, Union Department of the West	Missouri State Guard 6, Union 10	USA
August 3	Curran Post Office, Missouri	Confederate Western Army, Union Department of the West	unknown	Inconclusive
August 5	Athens, Missouri	Confederate Missouri State Guard, Union Home Guards and 21st Missouri Infantry	Confederate 28, Union 11	USA
August 7	Hampton, Virginia	Confederate cavalry, Union 20th New York.	Confederate 9, Union unknown	USA?
August 8	Lovettsville, Virginia	Confederate and Union forces	Confederate 6, Union unknown	USA?
August 10	Wilson's Creek, Missouri	Missouri State Guard and Confederate Department No. 2, Union Department of the West	Confederate 464, Missouri State Guard 758, Union 1,317	CSA
August 10	Potosi, Missouri	Confederate cavalry, Union Missouri Home Guards.	Confederate 5, Union 5	USA
August 17	Palmyra, Missouri	Confederate and Union forces	unknown	USA?
August 25	Mason's Hill, Virginia	detachments from Confederate Army of the Potomac and Union Department of the Potomac	unknown	USA
August 26	Kessler's Cross Lanes, West Virginia	Confederate infantry, Union Department of the Ohio	Confederate 40, Union 132	CSA
August 28–29	Hatteras Inlet, North Carolina	Confederate garrison of Fort Hatteras and Fort Clark, Union North Carolina Expedition	Confederate 670, Union 3	USA
August 29	Lexington, Missouri	Confederate cavalry, Union Missouri Home Guards.	unknown	CSA
August 31	Munson's Hill, Virginia	Confederate detachment, Department of Northern Virginia, Union detachment, Army of the Potomac.	Confederate unknown, Union 5	USA
September 2	Dry Wood Creek, Missouri	Missouri State Guard, Union Department of the West	Missouri State Guard unknown, Union 14	CSA
September 3	Bailey's Cross Roads, Virginia	detachments of Confederate Army of the Potomac and Union Department of the Potomac	Confederate none, Union 8	CSA
September 10	Carnifax Ferry, West Virginia	Confederate infantry, Union Department of the Ohio	Confederate 32, Union 158	USA
September 11	Lewinsville, Virginia	detachments of Confederate Army of the Potomac and Union Department of the Potomac	Confederate none, Union 18	CSA
September 12–15	Cheat Mountain, West Virginia	Confederate infantry, Union Department of the Ohio	Confederate 100, Union 71	USA
September 13–20	Lexington, Missouri	Missouri State Guard, Union garrison of Lexington, Missouri	Missouri State Guard 100, Union 3,500	CSA
September 17	Blue Mills Landing, Missouri	Missouri State Guard, Union 3rd Iowa Infantry	Missouri State Guard 70, Union 56	CSA
September 19	Barbourville, Kentucky	Confederate Department No. 2, Union Kentucky home guard	Confederate 5, Union 15	CSA
September 23–25	Hanging Rock Pass, West Virginia	Confederate cavalry and infantry, Union cavalry and infantry	Confederate 5+, Union 60+	
September 25	Alamosa, New Mexico Territory	Confederate cavalry, Union Department of New Mexico	Confederate none, Union 10	CSA
September 25	Kanawha Gap, West Virginia	Confederate and Union infantry	Confederate 130, Union 14	USA
September 26	Hunter's Farm, Missouri	Confederate Missouri State Guard, Union Department of the West	Confederate 10, Union unknown	USA
September 27	near Fort Craig, New Mexico Territory	Confederate and Union cavalry	Confederate 10, Union 10	CSA?
September 27	Pinos Altos, New Mexico Territory	Confederate Arizona Guards and civilians, Chiricahua, Minibreno, and allied Apaches	Confederate and civilians 12, Apaches 30	CSA
October 3	Greenbrier River, West Virginia	Confederate infantry, Union Department of the Ohio	Confederate 52, Union 43	Inconclusive
October 9	Santa Rosa Island, Florida	Confederate brigade, Union garrison of Fort Pickens	Confederate 87, Union 67	USA
October 12	Head of the Passes, Louisiana	Confederate naval squadron, Union detachment of West Gulf Blockading Squadron	none (one Confederate and three Union ships damaged)	CSA
October 21	Fredericktown	Missouri State Guard, Union garrison	Missouri State Guard 62, Union unknown	USA
October 21	Ball's Bluff, Virginia	Confederate Army of the Potomac, Union Army of the Potomac	Confederate 149, Union 1,000	CSA
October 21	Camp Wildcat, Kentucky	Confederate Department No. 2, Union Army of the Ohio	Confederate 53, Union 43	USA
October 25	Springfield, Missouri	Missouri State Guard, Union infantry	Missouri State Guard 133, Union 85	USA
November 3–7	Port Royal, South Carolina	Confederate Department of South Carolina, Union South Atlantic Blockading Squadron	Confederate 40, Union 31	USA
November 7	Belmont, Missouri	Confederate Department No. 2, Union Department of the West	Confederate 641, Union 607	USA
November 8–9	Ivy Mountain, Kentucky	Confederate Department No. 2, Union Army of the Ohio	Confederate 263, Union 30	USA
November 19	Round Mountain, Oklahoma	Confederate and Union Indians	Confederate 10, Union unknown	CSA
November 20	Brownsville, Kentucky	Confederate detachment from Department No. 2, Union Department of the Cumberland	Confederate 1, Union 12	CSA
November 26	Hunter's Mills, Virginia	Confederate Department of Northern Virginia, Union Army of the Potomac	unknown	CSA
December 9	Chusto-Talasah, Oklahoma	Confederate and Union Indians	Confederate 52, Union 412	CSA
December 13	Camp Allegheny, West Virginia	Confederate infantry, Union Department of the Ohio	Confederate 146, Union 137	Inconclusive
December 17	Rowlett's Station, Kentucky	Confederate Department No. 2, Union Army of the Ohio	Confederate 91, Union 40	Inconclusive
December 20	Dranesville, Virginia	Confederate cavalry from Army of the Potomac, Union detachment from Army of the Potomac	Confederate 230, Union 71	USA
December 26	Chustenahlah, Oklahoma	Confederate and Union Indians	Confederate 40, Union 211	CSA
December 28	Mount Zion Church, Missouri	Missouri State Guard, Union Department of the West	Missouri State Guard 210, Union 72	USA
December 28	Sacramento, Kentucky	Confederate and Union cavalry	Confederate 5, Union 23	CSA

== See also ==
- Missouri secession
- Origins of the American Civil War

== Sources ==
- Brooksher, William Riley. Bloody Hill: The Civil War Battle of Wilson's Creek. Washington, D.C.: Brassy's, 1995. ISBN 1-57488-018-7.
- Davis, William C. Battle at Bull Run: A History of the First Major Campaign of the Civil War. New York: Doubleday & Company, 1977. ISBN 9780385122610.
- Foote, Shelby. The Civil War: A Narrative. Volume I: Fort Sumter to Perryville. New York: Vintage Books, 1958. ISBN 0-394-74623-6.
- Frazier, Donald S. Blood & Treasure: Confederate Empire in the Southwest. College Station, Texas: Texas A&M University Press, 1995. ISBN 0-89096-639-7.
- Gottfried, Bradley M. The Maps of First Bull Run: An Atlas of the First Bull Run (Manassas) Campaign, including the Battle of Ball's Bluff, June–October 1861. New York: Savas Beatie, 2009. ISBN 978-1-932714-60-9.
- Hughes, Jr., Nathaniel Cheaires. The Battle of Belmont: Grant Strikes South. Chapel Hill, North Carolina: University of North Carolina Press, 1991. ISBN 0-8078-1968-9.
- Hurst, Jack. Nathan Bedford Forrest: A Biography. New York: Alfred A. Knopf, 1993. ISBN 0-394-55189-3.
- Josephy, Jr., Alvin M. The Civil War in the American West. New York: Alfred A. Knopf, 1992. ISBN 0-394-56482-0.
- Kennedy, Frances H. The Civil War Battlefield Guide, 2nd edition. New York: Houghton Mifflin, 1998. ISBN 0-395-74012-6.
- Moore, Frank. Anecdotes, Poetry, and Incidents of the War: North and South: 1860–1865. New York: The Arundel Print, 1888. OCLC 10343647
- Neal, Diane and Thomas W. Kremm. Lion of the South: General Thomas C. Hindman. Macon, Georgia: Mercer University Press, 1993. ISBN 0-86554-422-0.
- Piston, William Garnett & Richard W. Hatcher III. Wilson's Creek: The Second Battle of the Civil War and the Men Who Fought It. Chapel Hill, North Carolina: University of North Carolina Press, 2000. ISBN 0-8078-2515-8.
- Poland, Jr., Charles P. The Glories Of War: Small Battles And Early Heroes Of 1861. Bloomington, IN: AuthorHouse, 2006. ISBN 978-1-4184-5973-4.
- Robertson, Jr., James I. General A. P. Hill: The Story of a Confederate Warrior. New York: Random House, 1987. ISBN 0-394-55257-1.
- Wills, Mary Alice. The Confederate Blockade of Washington, D.C., 1861–1862. Shippensburg, Pennsylvania: Burd Street Press, 1998. ISBN 1-57249-078-0.
