= 7th Indiana Infantry Regiment =

7th Regiment Indiana Volunteer Infantry
- Active: April 21, 1861, to August 2, 1861; September 13, 1861, to September 20, 1864 (Note: Although not official until the 1890s, this general design was used by several Indiana regiments for their state colors)
- Country: United States
- Allegiance: Union
- Branch: Army
- Type: Infantry
- Engagements: Battle of Philippi; Battle of Laurel Hill; Battle of Corrick's Ford; Cheat Mountain Campaign; Battle of Greenbrier River; Camp Baldwin Expedition; First Battle of Kernstown; Battle of Port Republic; Battle of Groveton; Battle of Second Bull Run; Battle of South Mountain; Battle of Antietam; Battle of Fredericksburg; Battle of Chancellorsville; Battle of Gettysburg; Battle of the Wilderness; Battle of Spotsylvania; Siege of Petersburg

The 7th Regiment Indiana Volunteer Infantry was an infantry regiment from the State of Indiana that served in the Union Army during the American Civil War.

== Service ==
The 7th Indiana Volunteer Infantry was organized at Indianapolis, Indiana, between April 21 and April 27, 1861. The Regiment was sent to Grafton, Virginia (now West Virginia) on May 30, 1861, and participated in the Battle of Philippi, one of the first land battles of the Civil War, on June 3, 1861.

As part of Brigadier General Thomas A. Morris' Indiana Brigade (of Major General George B. McClellan's Army of West Virginia), the 7th Indiana participated in the Rich Mountain Campaign from July 6 to 17. The regiment saw action at Laurel Hill (July 7), Belington (July 8), the Battle of Corrick's Ford (July 12–14), and in the pursuit of Brig. Gen. Robert S. Garnett's forces (July 15–17). The regiment was mustered out of service on August 2, 1861.

A new 7th Indiana was organized from the three-month regiment at Indianapolis, Indiana, on September 13, 1861. The regiment mustered out of service on September 20, 1864. Men who re-enlisted, and those still with unexpired service, were transferred to the 19th Indiana Volunteer Infantry Regiment.

== Total strength and casualties ==
The three-month regiment suffered one enlisted man killed in battle and two enlisted men who died of disease, for a total of three fatalities.

The re-mustered regiment suffered 8 officers and 108 enlisted men killed in action or died of wounds and 2 officers and 111 enlisted men who died of disease, for a total of 229 fatalities.

== Commanders ==
- Colonel Ebenezer Dumont
- Colonel Ira G. Grover

== See also ==
- List of Indiana Civil War regiments
- Indiana in the Civil War

== Notes/References/Sources ==
Notes

Sources

- Dyer, Frederick Henry (1908). A Compendium of the War of the Rebellion (PDF). Des Moines, IA: Dyer Pub. Co. p. 1120. ASIN B01BUFJ76Q. This article incorporates text from this source, which is in the public domain.
- Federal Publishing Company (1908). Military Affairs and Regimental Histories of New Jersey, Indiana, Illinois and Michigan (PDF). The Union Army: A History of Military Affairs in the Loyal States, 1861–65 – Records of the Regiments in the Union army – Cyclopedia of battles – Memoirs of Commanders and Soldiers. Vol. III. Madison, WI: Federal Publishing Company. pp. 111–112. OCLC 694018100. This article incorporates text from this source, which is in the public domain.
- Terrell, William Henry Harrison (1865). Report of the Adjutant General of the State of Indiana (pdf). Indiana Adjutant General Reports. Vol. II. Indianapolis, IN: A.H. Connor State Printer. pp. 40–47. OCLC 558004259. This article incorporates text from this source, which is in the public domain.
- "Indiana Battle Flag Inventory". Indiana War Memorial. May 4, 2021.
- Union Regimental Histories - Indiana, The Civil War Archive website, after Dyer, Frederick Henry. A Compendium of the War of the Rebellion. 3 vols. New York: Thomas Yoseloff, 1959.
- Civil War - Indiana
