= George A. Porterfield =

Confederate States Army colonel and banker

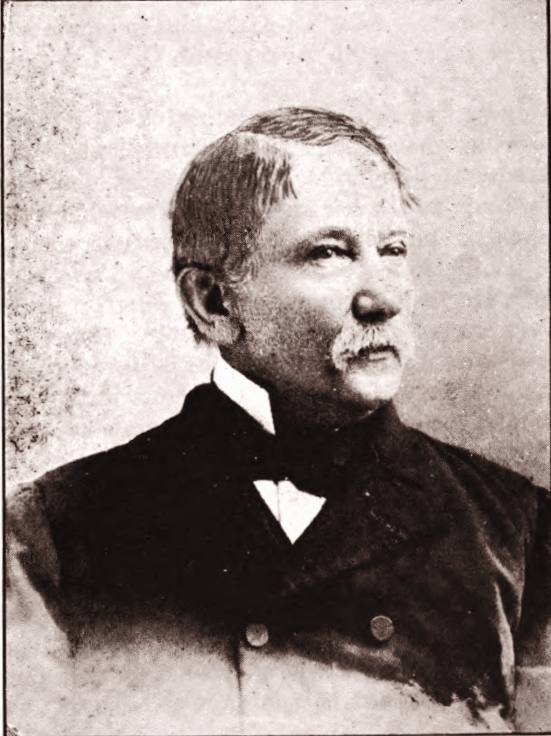
- Born: George Alexander Porterfield; November 24, 1822; Berkeley County, Virginia, U.S.
- Died: February 27, 1919 (aged 96); Martinsburg, West Virginia, U.S.
- Burial place: Greenhill Cemetery; Martinsburg, West Virginia
- Relatives: James B. Terrill (brother-in-law); William R. Terrill (brother-in-law)
- Military career
- Allegiance: United States of America; Confederate States of America
- Branch: United States Army; Confederate States Army
- Service years: 1847–1848 (USA); 1861–1862 (CSA)
- Rank: First Lieutenant (USA); Colonel (CSA)
- Unit: 1st Virginia Regiment (USA)
- Commands: 25th Virginia Infantry (CSA)
- Conflicts: Mexican–American War; American Civil War; Battle of Philippi
- Other work: Banker

George Alexander Porterfield (November 24, 1822 – February 27, 1919) was a junior officer of United States forces in the Mexican–American War, colonel, in the Confederate States Army during the first year of the American Civil War and longtime banker in Charles Town, West Virginia, after the war. He was in command of Confederate forces at Philippi in northwestern Virginia, later West Virginia, when they were surprised and routed, though with only a few soldiers wounded or captured, by Union Army forces on June 3, 1861, near the beginning of the Civil War. After serving in staff and temporary field positions for 11 more months, Porterfield resigned from the Confederate Army because he lost his position in a regimental election. In 1871 he helped found a bank at Charles Town, West Virginia, which he served for many years. At his death, he was the third-last surviving veteran officer of the Mexican–American War.

== Early life ==
George Alexander Porterfield was born in Berkeley County, Virginia, on November 24, 1822. He was the son of George and Mary (Tabb) Porterfield and the grandson of William and Rachel (Vance) Porterfield. His grandfather was a captain in the American Revolutionary War, a justice of Berkeley County in 1785 and high sheriff of the county in 1803. His father was a veteran of the War of 1812.

Porterfield was a graduate of the Virginia Military Institute (VMI) in the class of 1844. At Richmond, Virginia, in May 1846, he helped organize the first company of Virginia volunteers for service in the Mexican–American War. He was elected first lieutenant. Soon after arriving in Mexico, he was appointed adjutant of the 1st Virginia Regiment, then acting assistant adjutant general of his brigade and later assistant adjutant general of the division at Buena Vista, Mexico.

He became an editor of the Martinsburg Gazette and a teacher after the war. After a few years in a government job with the United States Coast Survey in Washington, D.C., he returned to Jefferson County as a farmer in 1855. He was living with his family on his farm when the Civil War began.

On July 9, 1849, George Porterfield married Emily Cornelia Terrill. She was the daughter of Elizabeth (Pitzer) Terrill and Colonel William Henry Terrill (1800–1877), a lawyer and prosecuting attorney in Bath County, Virginia, a member of the Virginia House of Delegates from Allegheny County, 1829–1831, and provost marshal for Bath County during the Civil War. She was the sister of Confederate General James Barbour Terrill, Phillip M. Terrill, a lieutenant in Company B of the 12th Virginia Infantry Regiment and Union General William Rufus Terrill. All three brothers were killed in action. A fourth brother, George Parker Terrill, who was an 1849 graduate of VMI and 1853 graduate of the University of Pennsylvania medical school, survived the war. George Parker Terrill started his Confederate service as Colonel of the 157th Virginia militia. Later in the war, Doctor Terrill served as a recruiter and post surgeon.

George and Emily Porterfield had four sons and three daughters. Their son John followed George in the banking business.

== American Civil War service ==
=== In command in northwestern Virginia ===
After the Virginia Secession Convention effectively took the state out of the Union by passing an ordinance of secession on April 17, 1861, the Convention authorized Governor of Virginia John Letcher to form an army and a navy to protect the State pending a popular vote to ratify the State's secession on May 23, 1861. Letcher appointed recently resigned U.S. Army Colonel Robert E. Lee as major general to command the Virginia forces, which closely cooperated with the Confederacy until Virginia officially seceded from the Union and joined the Confederacy.

George Porterfield initially was appointed colonel and inspector general of militia at Harpers Ferry, Virginia. On May 4, 1861, General Lee ordered Porterfield to organize forces at Grafton in northwest Virginia, now West Virginia. Porterfield was expected to hold and protect both the main line and the Parkersburg branch of the Baltimore and Ohio Railroad at that location. Porterfield arrived in Grafton on May 14, 1861. He found that the townspeople, being mostly Irish railroad workers, mainly supported the Union and that the pro-Union Grafton Guards militia company occupied the town. He found no secessionist officers and men at Grafton and, setting up at the more friendly location of Fetterman, about 2 miles (3.2 km) north of Grafton, he soon discovered that the few volunteer companies in the area were armed poorly, if at all. In Fetterman he found Capt. William P. Thompson and his company, the Marion Guards, equipped with 175 muskets which had been purchased by Thompson. Porterfield was able to intercept Federal telegraph messages with local support, and reported to Lee that companies were being organized in Clarksburg, Pruntytown, Philippi, Weston, and Fairmont, but that only two were armed, and one had only "old flint-lock muskets, in bad order, and no amumnition...". The companies raised under Porterfield were later organized into the 25th Virginia Infantry, the 31st Virginia Infantry, and the 9th Battalion of Virginia Infantry. He advised authorities in Richmond that they would need to send a large force to hold the area for the state, but the leaders in Richmond, including General Lee, were unwilling to send soldiers from the eastern part of the state to the western counties at that time for reasons that included not irritating Union sympathizers in the area. On May 19 General Lee advised Colonel Porterfield that several companies from Staunton, Virginia, would be sent to Beverly, Virginia, for his command.

Since the Grafton Guards had departed for Wheeling to be mustered into the Union Army, Porterfield occupied Grafton on May 25, but did not keep his force there long. Porterfield then decided that he could not capture or even raid Wheeling, Virginia, for supplies as desired by Governor Letcher and that his position at Grafton was threatened. In order to prevent the advance of Union forces, Porterfield decided to burn two bridges on the Baltimore and Ohio Railroad between Farmington and Mannington, West Virginia. He ordered Colonel William J. Willey to carry out this mission on May 25. Since Porterfield continued to have only a few poorly-equipped companies numbering about 550 men under his command, had not yet received requested arms and ammunition, and was given information on May 27, 1861, that Union regiments under the overall departmental command of Major General George B. McClellan were headed toward Grafton, he decided that his position at Grafton was untenable. Porterfield learned that Union forces from both Wheeling under the immediate command of Colonel Benjamin Franklin Kelley and from Parkersburg under the immediate command of Colonel James B. Steedman were headed toward Grafton to protect the Baltimore and Ohio Railroad for the Union. On May 28, Porterfield withdrew his force to Philippi, strongly secessionist in sentiment, in Barbour County about 30 miles (48 km) to the south of Grafton. Also on May 28, McClellan placed the entire Union force in western Virginia, about 3,000 men, under the command of Brigadier General Thomas A. Morris. On May 30, Colonel Kelley occupied Grafton. He had spent two days working with his force to restore the two bridges that had been burned. Since the bridges were mainly iron structures, only wooden sills and ties needed to be replaced. Porterfield picked up two companies of additional men in his move to Philippi but had to send two more companies home for lack of arms and ammunition. A Confederate court of inquiry concluded on July 4, 1861, that Porterfield had 600 effective infantry and 175 cavalry available at Philippi.

=== Battle of Philippi ===
On June 2, 1861, General Morris sent two columns of soldiers, one under the command of Colonel Kelley and one under the command of Colonel Ebenezer Dumont to attack the Confederates at Philippi. At about dawn on June 3, 1861, the larger Union force surprised the Confederates under Porterfield's command who were mostly still asleep in their tents in their camp just outside Philippi. The Confederates had few poorly positioned pickets on duty on the rainy night of June 2–3 and the Union force was able to approach close to the camp until being discovered because of the premature firing of firearms. After the attack began, some Confederates fired a few return shots but soon the entire Confederate force began to flee in disorder without putting up a serious fight, and leaving most of their supplies. Only a few men were wounded during the brief fight, including Union Colonel Kelley, but at least a small number of Confederates were captured. This rout led to the Battle of Philippi being called the "Philippi Races." Porterfield and those of his men who were not dispersed or captured reorganized down the road and retreated to Beverly, Virginia, about 30 miles (48 km) to the south.

=== Aftermath of Philippi ===
Porterfield was blamed for the disastrous display of the Confederate force at Philippi and he asked for a court of inquiry, which concluded on July 4, 1861, that pickets were on duty before the attack, that much of Porterfield's command left the field in good order and that Porterfield was preparing to evacuate Philippi as soon as the day of the attack because he realized that he was in danger of attack by the larger Union force. General Lee decided that Colonel Porterfield deserved censure, though no more serious punishment, for unpreparedness. Porterfield was replaced in command of the Confederate forces in western Virginia by Brigadier General Robert S. Garnett on June 13, 1861, ten days after the battle. Porterfield was left in command of troops at Beverly. Garnett's force of about 5,000 men suffered an even greater defeat at the Battle of Rich Mountain on July 11, 1861, and Garnett himself became the first general to be killed in action in the Civil War two days later in a rearguard action at the Battle of Corrick's Ford.

=== Subsequent assignments and resignation ===
Porterfield joined the staff of Confederate Brigadier General William W. Loring and became his chief of ordnance on August 9, 1861. He briefly commanded a brigade under Brigadier General (later Major General) Edward "Allegheny" Johnson from April 21 to May 1, 1862. In the reorganization of the 25th Virginia Regiment on May 1, 1862, with the addition of several companies of the 9th Battalion Virginia Infantry, Porterfield was not re-elected to his command. Feeling unfairly treated and gaining no satisfaction from an appeal, nor any consideration for promotion to brigadier general as recommended by General Johnson, Porterfield soon resigned. He was found by Union forces under General Nathaniel P. Banks in June or July 1862 and arrested. Soon after Porterfield was taken prisoner, however, Banks ordered Porterfield to be paroled. He was never formally exchanged and took no further part in the war.

== Post-war; death ==
In 1871, George Porterfield became one of the founders of the Bank of Charles Town in Jefferson County, West Virginia, which he served for many years as cashier.

Porterfield was a member of the Aztec Club of Mexican–American War veterans. As one of the longest-lived members of the Aztec Club, and one of the last three surviving members, he served as vice president, 1914–1915 and President, 1915–1916.

George A. Porterfield died on February 27, 1919, at Martinsburg, West Virginia, and was buried at Greenhill Cemetery in Martinsburg.

== See also ==
- List of American Civil War generals (Acting Confederate)
