= Laurel Mountain (West Virginia) =

Mountain ridge in West Virginia, United States

Laurel Mountain, West Virginia
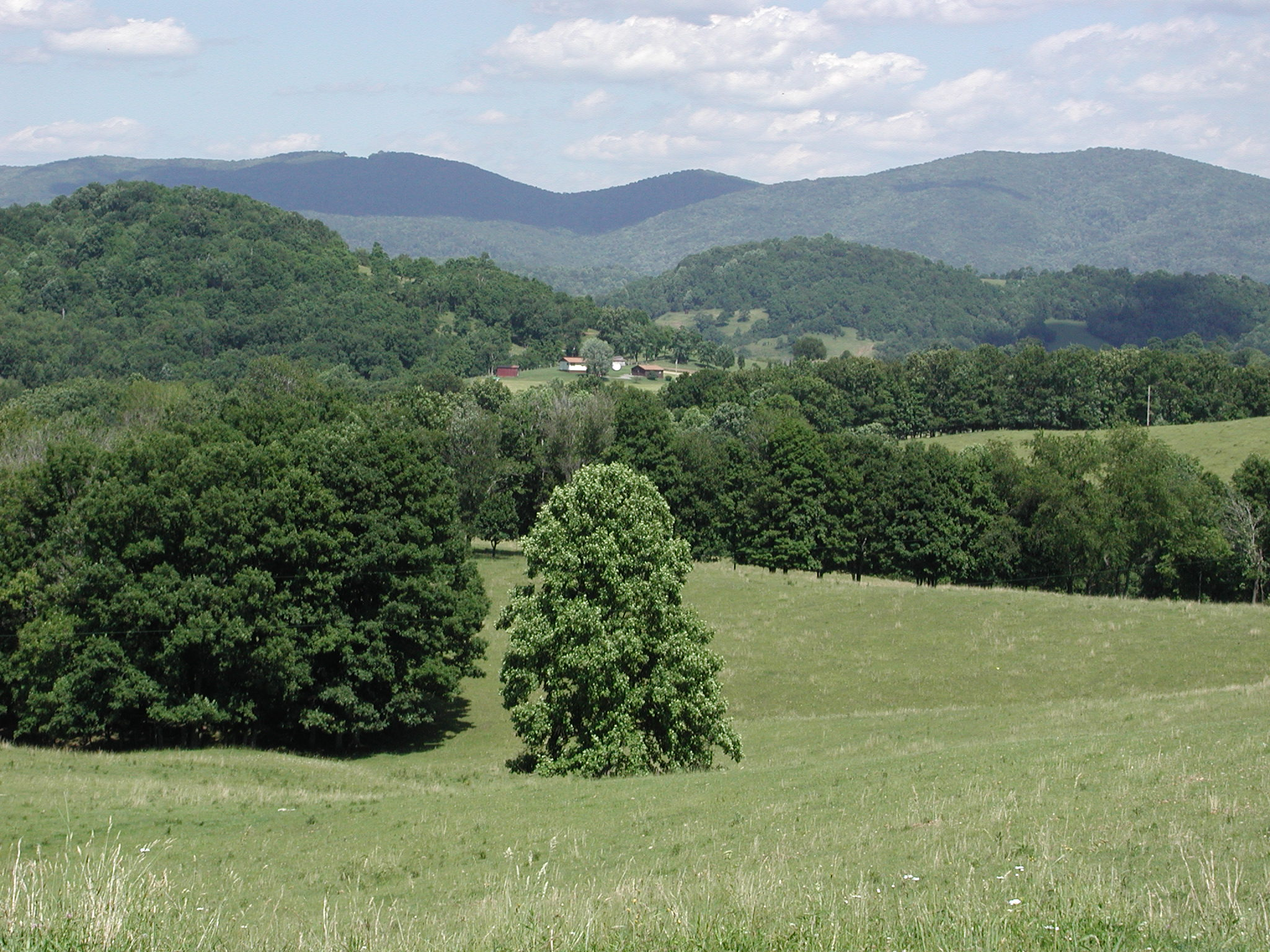

Highest point
- Elevation: 3,157 ft (962 m)
- Coordinates: 39°08′32″N 79°50′0″W

Geography
- Location: West Virginia, U.S.
- Parent range: Allegheny Mountains, part of the Ridge-and-Valley Appalachians
- Topo map: USGS Colebank

Laurel Mountain, also called Laurel Hill, is a long ridge in north-central West Virginia, US. Along with Rich Mountain to the south, it is considered to be the westernmost ridge of the Allegheny Mountains and the boundary between the Alleghenies and the Allegheny Plateau.

== Geography ==
Running northeast to southwest through Preston, Tucker, Barbour, and Randolph Counties, the ridge forms portions of the borders between them. It stretches for about 32 miles (51 km) from the Cheat River (near the town of Manheim) in the north to the Tygart Valley River (near the town of Aggregates) in the south. It achieves its highest elevation at the Eliot Benchmark (3,157 ft; 962 m) about 3.5 miles (5.6 km) north of Pleasure Valley.

The mountain is formed by the same structural fold in the Earth's crust which continues north from Laurel as Briery Mountains (north of Cheat River) and south as Rich Mountain (south of the Tygart Valley River). Although it is a long-folded ridge like Backbone Mountain, running northeast–southwest, similar to the parallel Appalachan Ridge and Valley Section further east, it is not part of the Ridge and Valley Area. Like Backbone Mountain, it is part of the Allegheny Mountain region to the west of the Ridge-and-Valley area. There is a short break, then north of the Pennsylvania state line, it continues northeast as Laurel Hill.

== History ==
Laurel Mountain's name was derived from the prolific "great laurel" (Rhododendron maximum) which the earliest pioneers found there in profusion the late 1700s.

After the June 3, 1861 Battle of Philippi (by some reckonings the first land battle of the Civil War), the Confederate forces, having been routed by the Union Army in Philippi, retreated south. Confederate General Robert S. Garnett moved about 3,500 troops to Laurel Mountain. The Confederates made camp at the foot of the mountain near the Laurel Mountain Road (today a winding single lane dirt road that crosses the mountain and connects the towns of Belington and Elkins). On July 6, General George B. McClellan ordered General Thomas A. Morris to advance from Philippi to Belington with about 5,000 Union troops. Skirmishing began on July 7 and lasted for five days (the "Battle of Laurel Hill"), with the Union routing the Confederate troops. Upon hearing of the simultaneous defeat of forces at Rich Mountain, General Garnett retreated with his troops to Corrick's Ford near Parsons where he soon became the first general officer to be killed in the war.

Later that summer, General Robert E. Lee maneuvered against Brig. Gen. Joseph J. Reynolds at Cheat Mountain and in the Tygart Valley. He called off the attack and eventually withdrew to Valley Head on September 17. In October, he renewed operations against Laurel Mountain with the troops of Floyd and Loring, but operations were called off owing to communication and logistical difficulties. Lee was recalled to Richmond on October 30 after achieving little in western Virginia and with his reputation diminished.

In recent years, production of a "Battle of Laurel Hill Reenactment" has been undertaken at the site of the Laurel Hill Battlefield on its anniversary dates. In 2004, the City of Belington assumed ownership of 50 acres (200,000 m^{2}) of the old camp and battlefield.

== Wind turbines ==
The AES Corporation has constructed wind turbines on Laurel Mountain. The wind farm opened in October 2011 with 61 turbines stretched across 12 miles. AES can generate up to 98 megawatts of electricity with this facility. A notable feature of the project is the largest battery installation attached to the power grid in the continental United States. The purpose of the 1.3 million batteries is to tame the wind, but only slightly. AES states the batteries will be a shock absorber of sorts, making variations in wind energy production a little less jagged and the farm's output more useful to the grid.
