= Virginia campaign =

Virginia campaign may refer to:

- Yorktown campaign, the final campaign of the American Revolutionary War
- Any campaign occurring in Virginia in the American Civil War, including:
  - First Bull Run Campaign
  - Peninsular Campaign
  - Northern Virginia campaign
  - Western Virginia campaign
  - Overland Campaign
  - Richmond–Petersburg campaign
