= Western Virginia campaign =

1861 Union offensive

- Part of the American Civil War
Date	May to December, 1861
Location	Western Virginia (now West Virginia)
Result	Union victory

Belligerents
United States (Union)	(Confederate States of America) Confederate States (Confederacy)

Commanders and leaders
Abraham Lincoln; Simon Cameron; George B. McClellan; Thomas M. Harris; Isaac Duval; William S. Rosecrans; Thomas A. Morris	Jefferson Davis; LeRoy Pope Walker (until September); Robert E. Lee; Robert S. Garnett †; Henry A. Wise; John B. Floyd; John Pegram (POW)

The western Virginia campaign, also known as operations in western Virginia or the Rich Mountain campaign, occurred from May to December 1861 during the American Civil War. Union forces under Major General George B. McClellan invaded the western portion of Virginia to prevent Confederate occupation; this area later became the state of West Virginia. West Virginians on both sides would fight in the campaign while a Unionist convention in Wheeling would appoint their choice for a Unionist governor for Virginia, Francis H. Pierpont, and promote the creation of a new state in western Virginia. Large scale Confederate forces would gradually abandon the region, leaving it to small local brigades to maintain hold on southern and eastern sections for much of the war.

Western Virginia was an important source of minerals the Confederates needed for the production of arms and ammunition. It also contained several roads and turnpikes which would grant the Union access to Tennessee, North Carolina, and the Shenandoah Valley, while the Baltimore and Ohio Railroad in the northern part of the area connected the eastern Union states to the Midwest.

== Background ==
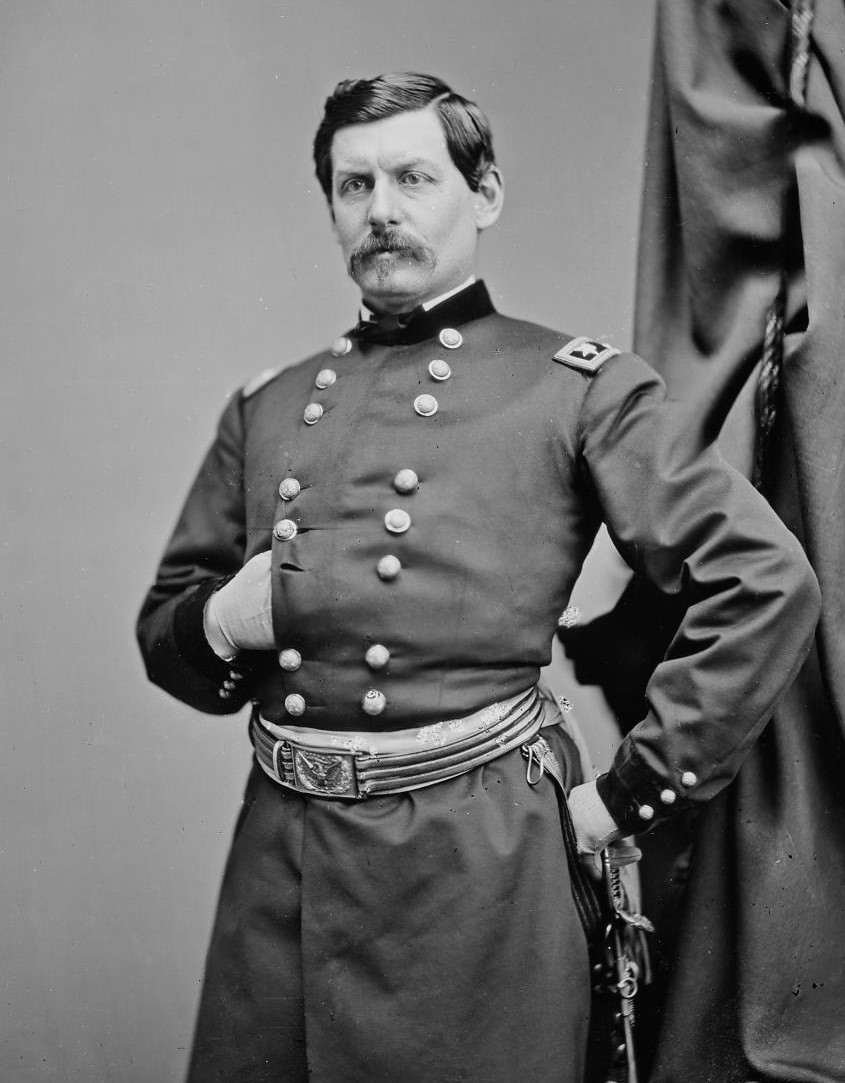
George B. McClellan, Union commander in western Virginia from May to June 1861

In April 1861 a Virginia state convention voted to secede and join the Confederacy. However, there was much opposition to this action from the western counties of the state, which were tied closer to western Pennsylvania and Ohio than to eastern Virginia. Following the secession vote in Richmond, John Carlile, a Unionist leader from northwest Virginia, led a meeting at Clarksburg which called for a convention to meet at Wheeling the next month for determining what steps "the people of Northwest Virginia should take in the present emergency." The 1st and 2nd West Virginia Union infantry regiments were also raised the same month, participating in the first battle of the campaign at Philippi. To organize Union forces in the area, George B. McClellan was appointed commander of the Department of the Ohio, covering Ohio, Indiana, Illinois, western Pennsylvania, and western Virginia. He gathered several regiments raised in Ohio, Indiana, and western Virginia and moved into Virginia in early May, moving along the Baltimore and Ohio Railroad and the Kanawha River. West Virginia, both before and after it was granted statehood, raised several infantry, cavalry and artillery regiments throughout the war to fight on the side of the Union.

The Confederates appointed several commanders to organize troops in western Virginia: Colonel George A. Porterfield in northwestern Virginia, and Brigadier Generals John B. Floyd and Henry A. Wise in the Kanawha Valley. This divided command structure prevented the Confederates from coordinating their response to the Union invasion; in addition, General Robert E. Lee, commander of the Virginia militia forces, underestimated the strength of Unionist support in western Virginia.

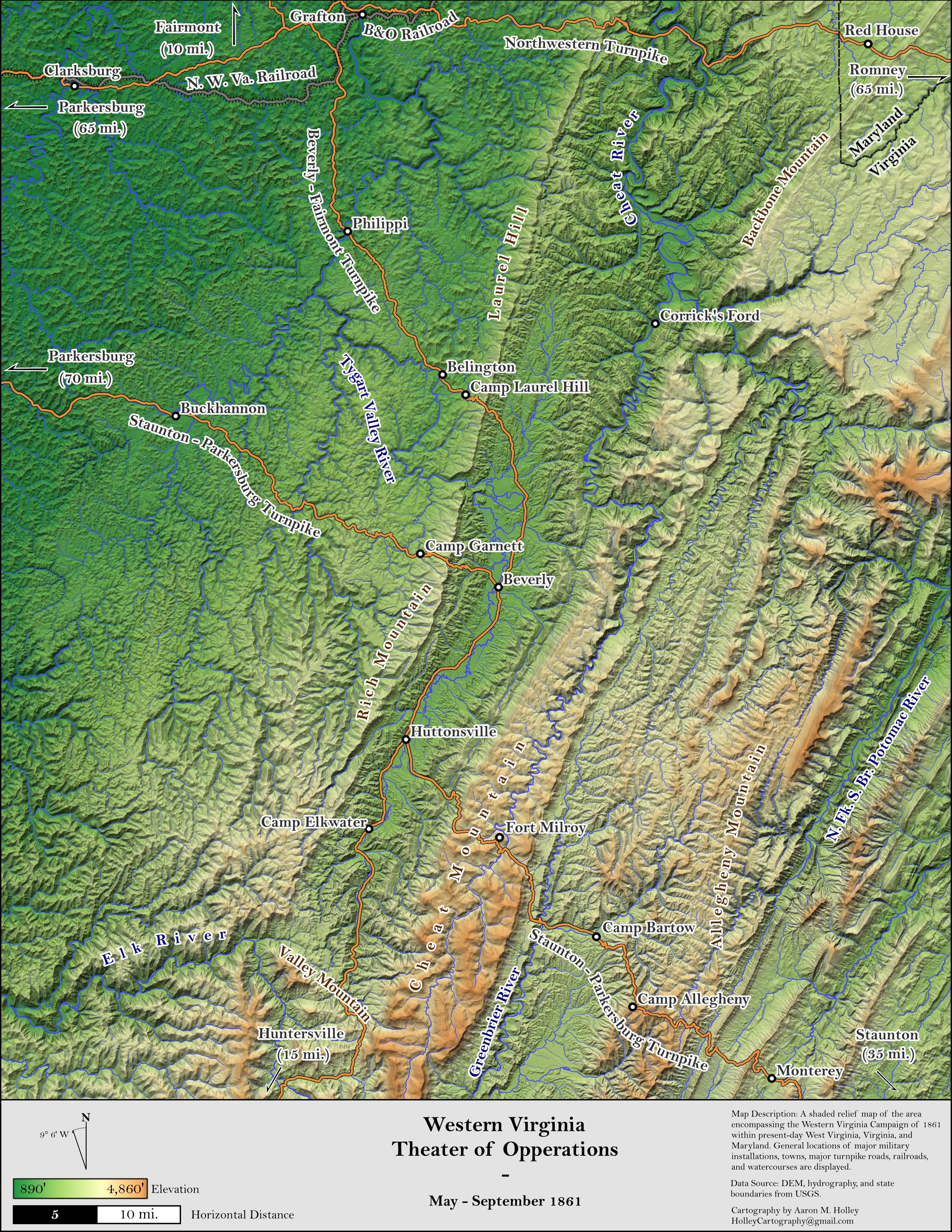
A shaded relief map of the area encompassing the Western Virginia Campaign of 1861 within present-day West Virginia, Virginia, and Maryland. General locations of major military installations, towns, major turnpike roads, railroads, and watercourses are displayed.

== Battles ==
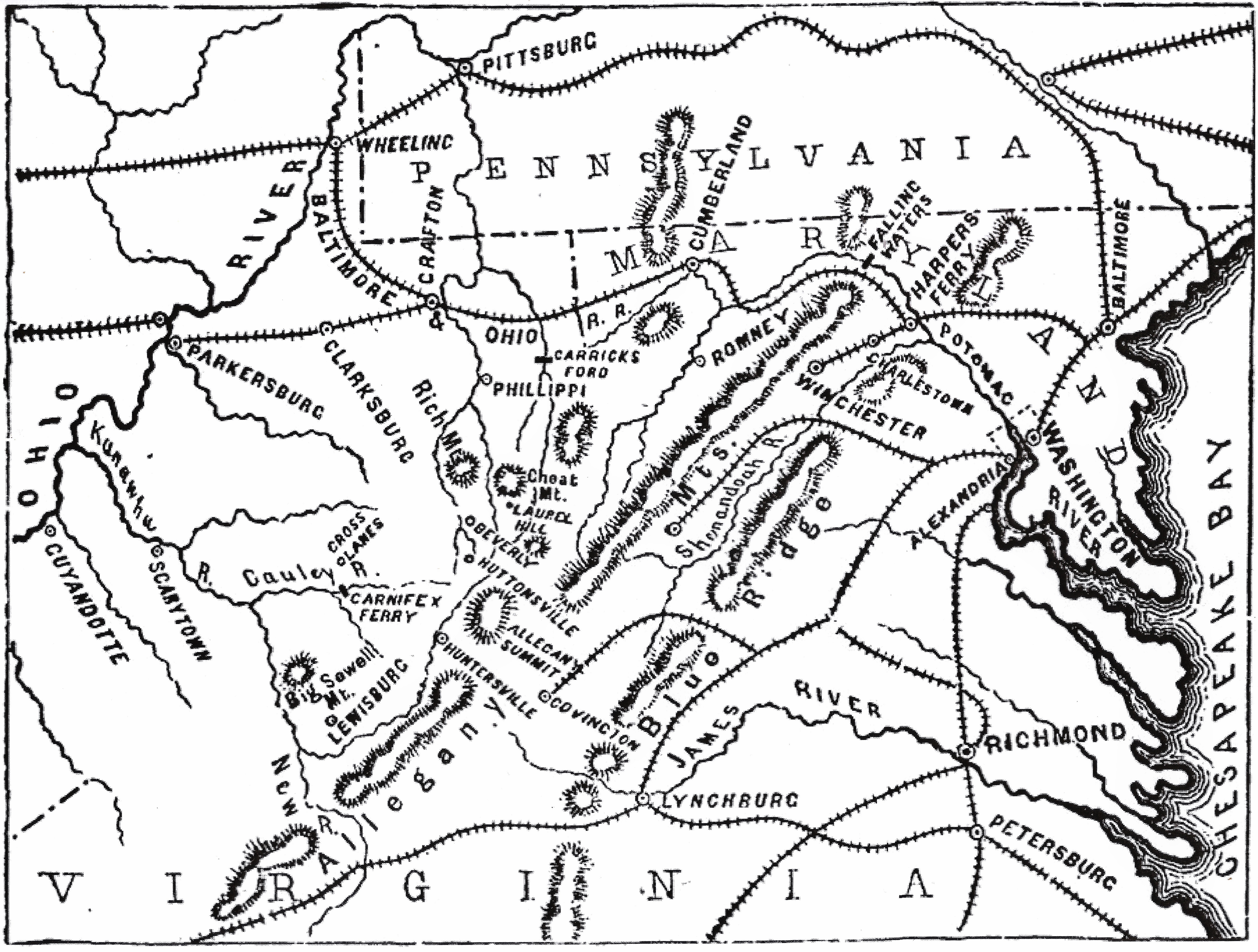
Civil war campaigns in Western Virginia in 1861

=== Philippi ===
Confederate Colonel Porterfield concentrated a force of 775 new recruits at the town of Philippi during the month of May. On June 3, a Union column under the command of Brigadier General Thomas A. Morris launched a two pronged attack on the Confederate camp. The Confederates fired a single volley and then retreated from the town. Only a few were wounded on each side.

=== Bowman's Place ===
A small Confederate force intended to disrupt Unionist elections in Tucker County and rode to St. George. They were ambushed by detachments from the 15th and 16th Ohio Infantries, with both sides sustaining light casualties and the Confederate party fled.

=== Rich Mountain and Laurel Mountain ===
Confederate Brigadier General Robert S. Garnett concentrated a small force around Laurel Mountain and Rich Mountain. McClellan detached a small force which outflanked and routed the Confederate left wing on Rich Mountain, which left the main Confederate force at Laurel Mountain isolated and forced Garnett to retreat.

=== Corrick's Ford ===
During the Confederate retreat from Rich Mountain, Garnett deployed a small force of skirmishers at a ford at the Cheat River in order to delay the Union pursuit. However, Garnett was killed by a Union volley, thus becoming the first general officer of either army to die in the war. The Confederate force was routed.

=== Scary Creek ===
Union regiments under Colonel John Lowe, part of the brigade of General Jacob Dolson Cox pushed up the Kanawha Valley and came upon the Confederate camp near Scary. The Confederates were under the command of Colonel George S. Patton Sr. The 21st Ohio Infantry Regiment charged with bayonets but were pushed back with casualties. The Union forces retreated and the Confederates won a small but important victory.

=== Kessler's Cross Lanes ===
The Confederate brigade of Floyd attacked a Union regiment under Colonel Erastus Tyler at Kessler's Cross Lanes and routed it, temporarily securing the eastern Kanawha Valley for the Confederates.

=== Carnifex Ferry ===
Brigadier General William S. Rosecrans took three brigades from Clarksburg and attacked Floyd's brigade at Carnifex Ferry. Although the Confederates were able to hold off the Union attacks, they were outnumbered and were forced to retreat that night.

=== Cheat Mountain ===
During the summer, the Union army concentrated their forces to protect the main highways through western Virginia. Brigadier General Joseph J. Reynolds commanded the Union garrison on Cheat Mountain that was supposed to protect the Staunton and Parkersburg Turnpike. Lee attempted to drive this force off the mountain with a complicated plan involving several columns which would converge on and surround the garrison. However, one of the brigade commanders who was scheduled to start the attack retreated at the last minute, forcing Lee to cancel the offensive.

=== Hanging Rock Pass ===
Union forces attempted to seize control of the town of Romney and were ambushed by Confederates.

=== Kanawha Gap ===
A Union force from the 34th Ohio and 1st Kentucky Infantry Regiments, led by Col. Abram S. Piatt attacked and defeated Confederate force in their fortifications at Kanawha Gap near Chapmanville. The victory aided in controlling the Kanawha Valley.

=== Greenbrier River ===
Union Brigadier General Reynolds attacked the camps of Henry R. Jackson's brigade but was repulsed. Following an artillery bombardment, Reynolds withdrew back to Cheat Mountain.

=== Camp Allegheny ===
Union Brigadier General Robert H. Milroy attacked Camp Allegheny, where Colonel Edward Johnson's main Confederate force in western Virginia was located. The Federal soldiers were repulsed.

== Aftermath ==
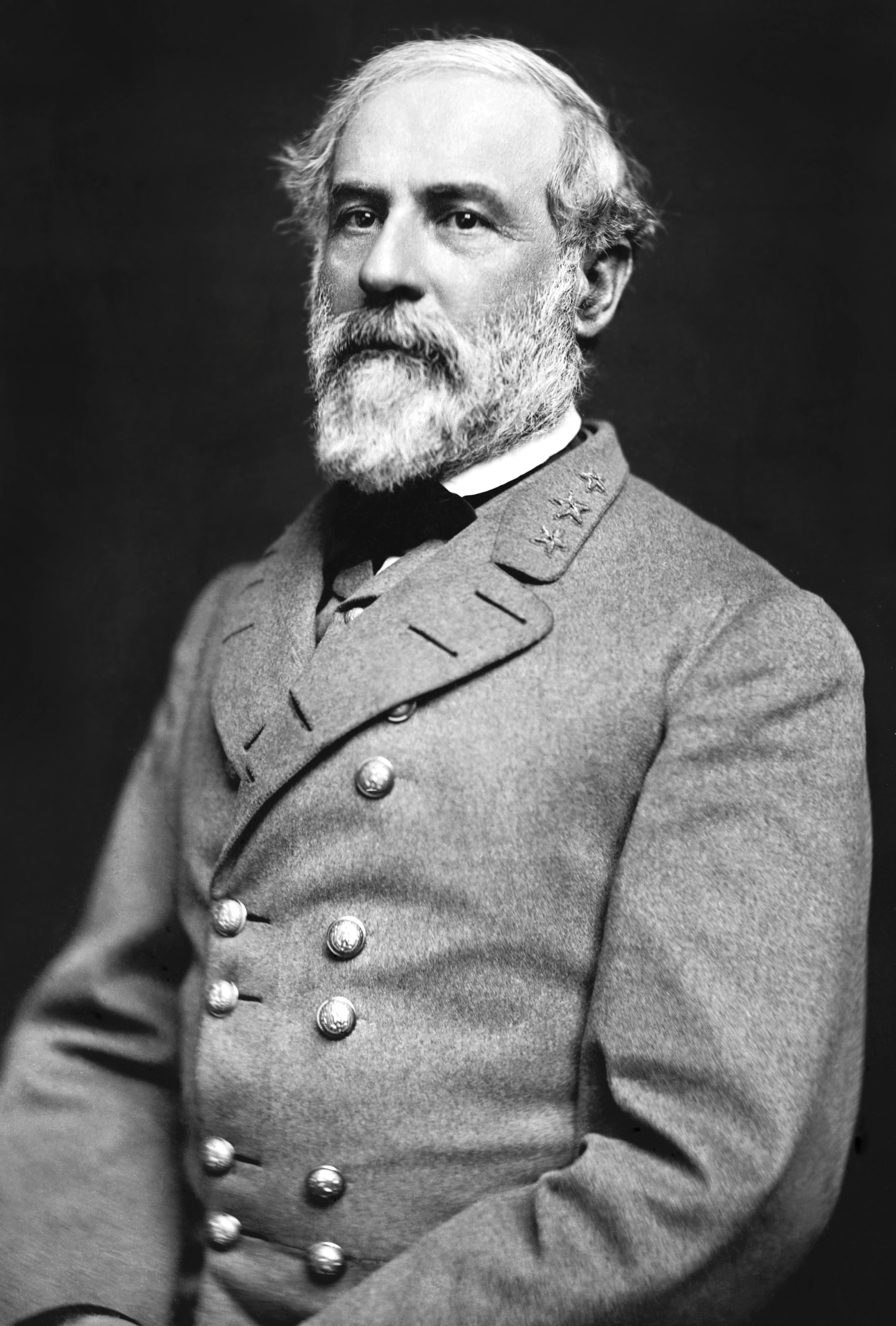
Robert E. Lee would be blamed for the Confederate defeats in western Virginia

The Union army would occupy the western region of Virginia for the rest of the war, despite several raids by the Confederates into the area. West Virginia would later be split from the Department of the Ohio and be formed into a new Department of Western Virginia. The Wheeling convention quickly organized the Restored Government of Virginia. This Unionist government claimed to be the legitimate government for the whole of Virginia with Richmond as its capital, although its de facto control was limited to those parts of the state held under federal arms. This arrangement would last until 1863 when western Virginia was admitted to the Union as the state of West Virginia. Following West Virginian statehood, the Restored Government re-located to Alexandria where it remained for the duration of the war.

Due to his victories in western Virginia, McClellan's reputation quickly grew in the North, where the newspapers called him the "Young Napoleon." Following the Union defeat at the First Battle of Bull Run, he was given command of the Army of the Potomac. Lee was much criticized in the press because of his defeat in western Virginia. Called by the press and the soldiers "Granny Lee" and "Evacuating Lee", he was transferred to South Carolina to supervise construction of coastal fortifications. The remaining forces in western Virginia were organized into the Army of the Northwest until it was incorporated into the Valley District of the Army of Northern Virginia.

== See also ==
- West Virginia in the American Civil War

== Sources ==
- Boeche, Thomas L. "McClellan's First Campaign." America's Civil War, January 1998.
- Cochran, Darrell. "Granny Lee's Inauspicious Debut." America's Civil War, September 1994.
- Gallagher, Gary W. "Rich Mountain, West Virginia (WV003), Randolph County, July 11, 1861." from The Civil War Battlefield Guide, 2nd Edition, edited by Frances H. Kennedy. New York: Houghton Mifflin, 1998
- Kennedy, Frances H. The Civil War Battlefield Guide, 2nd Edition. New York: Houghton Mifflin, 1998
- Newell, Clayton R. Lee Vs. McClellan: The First Campaign. Washington, D.C.: Regnary Publishing Inc., 1996. ISBN 0-89526-452-8
- Mallinson, David "Confused First Fight." America's Civil War, January 1992.
