= Battle of Laurel Hill (1861) =

1861 battle of the American Civil War

Coordinates: 39°0′31.22″N 79°54′32.32″W

Date	July 7–11, 1861
Location	Belington, West Virginia (then Virginia)
Result	Confederate Retreat

Belligerents
Union Army	Confederate Army

Commanders and leaders
BG Thomas A. Morris	BG Robert S. Garnett

Units involved
6th Indiana Infantry; 7th Indiana Infantry; 9th Indiana Infantry; 6th Ohio Infantry; 14th Ohio Infantry; 15th Ohio Infantry (Det.); 16th Ohio Infantry (Det.); 1st Virginia Infantry (U.S.); Grafton Guards; 1st Ohio Light Artillery	20th Virginia Infantry; 23rd Virginia Infantry; 27th Virginia Infantry; 31st Virginia Infantry; 1st Georgia Infantry six cavalry companies three arillery batteries

Strength
5,700	3,200

Casualties and losses
6 KIA, 6 Wounded	5 KIA, 5 Wounded
- Location within West Virginia

The Battle of Laurel Hill, also known as the Battle of Belington, was a minor battle in the American Civil War started on July 7, 1861 and concluded on July 11, 1861. The battle was a part of the Tygart Valley Campaign in western Virginia.

After the Battle of Philippi, Major General George B. McClellan would send Brigadier General Thomas A. Morris' brigade on a diversion while the main body of his troops attacked Rich Mountain.

On the morning of July 7, Morris began moving towards the road junction on the Morgantown Road (Barbour County) where his men would skirmish with Confederate pickets. The 9th Indiana would climb up a hill near the town of Belington where they would be met by the 1st Georgia and exchange fire.

The two sides would settle into skirmishes over the next five days. The weather would not be helpful as a series of rainstorms would pass through the area. The Confederate commander Brigadier General Robert S. Garnett would be content to a strong defense behind fortifications that his men had been preparing since June 16.

On July 11, after hearing about McClellan's victory at Rich Mountain, Garnett chose to retreat before becoming surrounded. He did so in a hard rain after dark. The Union troops would pursue the next morning, but the Confederates were already south of Beverly. Garnett's troops would be reengaged by the Federals on July 13 at the Battle of Corrick's Ford where he would be the first general officer killed in the Civil War.

== Battlefield ==
The battlefield is maintained near Belington, West Virginia and is the site of Civil War reenactments and other civic events.
