= James Edward Hanger =

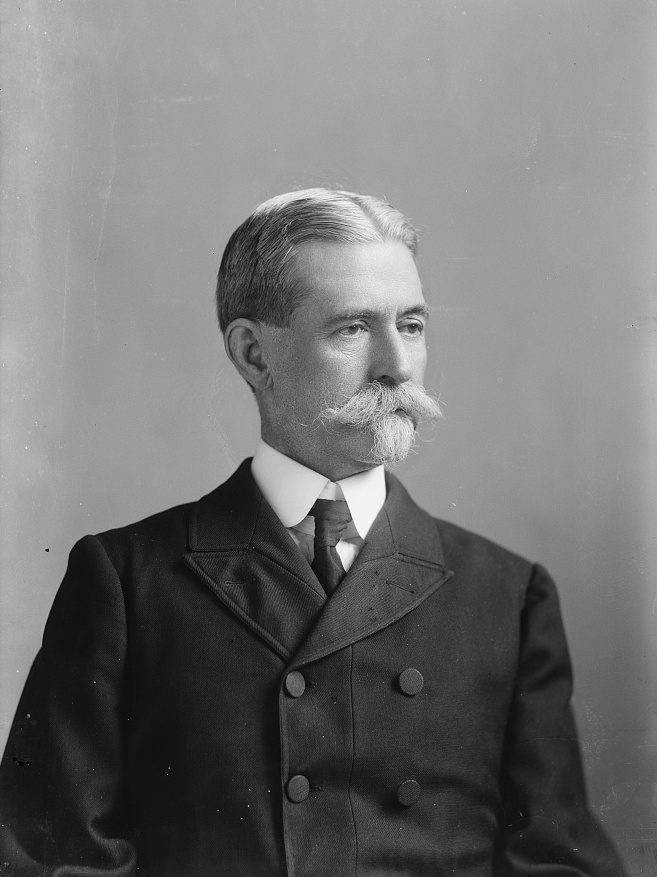
- Hanger taken by C. M. Bell Studio c. 1905
- Born: February 25, 1843; Churchville, Virginia, United States
- Died: June 9, 1919 (aged 76)
- Known for: Confederate States Army veteran, prosthetist, founder of J. E. Hanger, Inc. (Now Hanger Clinic)
- Height: 6 ft 2 in (188 cm)
- Spouse: Nora McCarthy (married 1879)
- Children: Princetta; Alice; James Edward; Herbert Blair; McCarthy; Hugh Hamilton; Henry Hoover; Albert Sidney
- Parent(s): William Alexander Hanger; Eliza Hogshed Hanger

James Edward Hanger (February 25, 1843 – June 9, 1919) was a Confederate States Army veteran of the American Civil War, a prosthetist and a businessman. It is reported that he became the first amputee of the war after being struck in the leg by a cannonball. Hanger subsequently designed and created his own prosthesis, then went on to found a prosthetic company that continues in business today.

== Early life and war service ==
Hanger was born at Mount Hope, his father's plantation near Churchville, Virginia. His parents were William Arthur Hanger and Eliza Hogshed Hanger. He attended local elementary schools and, in 1859, enrolled at Washington College in Lexington, Virginia, to study engineering. He was an 18-year-old sophomore when he decided to leave school and join the newly formed Churchville Cavalry, which was under the command of Captain Franklin Sterrett. Two of Hanger's brothers and four of his cousins were already enlisted with the company, and as he prepared to join them, his mother packed food and clothing to send along for her sons. An ambulance corps carrying supplies for the Confederacy passed through town, and Hanger joined the group, traveling to Philippi, Virginia (now West Virginia). He arrived on June 2, 1861, and after enlisting, spent the night in a nearby stable with a small group of untrained and badly equipped Confederates. While on guard duty the next morning, Hanger heard gunfire, and ran into the stable to get his horse. At that moment, a Union cannonball ricocheted inside the stable, striking his left leg below the knee. This was the beginning of the Battle of Philippi, also known as "The Philippi Races".

Author Robert J. Driver, Jr., in his book The 14th Virginia Cavalry, documents Hanger's firsthand account of this experience:

The first two shots were canister and directed at the Cavalry Camps, the third shot was a 6 pound solid shot aimed at a stable in which the Churchville Cavalry Company had slept. This shot struck the ground, richochetted (sic), entering the stable and struck me. I remained in the stable til they came looking for plunder, about four hours after I was wounded. My limb was amputated by Dr. James D. Robinson, 16th Ohio Volunteers.

Hanger's shattered leg was amputated about seven inches below the hip bone. This loss of limb is said to have been the first such occurrence of a war that saw more than 50,000 additional amputations performed.

Hanger remained in Philippi for several weeks and then was sent to Camp Chase in Ohio. In August 1861, he was returned to his family home in Virginia in a prisoner of war exchange.

== Recovery and invention ==
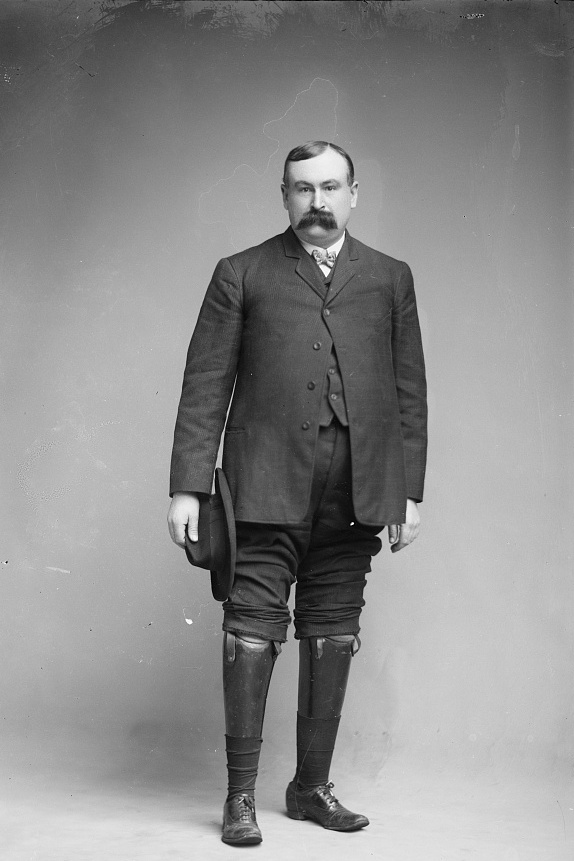
Model showing Hanger's prosthetics

Dissatisfied with both the fit and the function of his above-knee prosthesis, Hanger designed a new prosthesis constructed of whittled barrel staves and metal. His design used rubber bumpers rather than standard catgut tendons and featured hinges at both the knee and ankle. Hanger patented his limb in 1871 and it has received numerous additional patents for improvements and special devices which have brought international reputation to the product. The Virginia state government commissioned Hanger to manufacture the above-knee prosthesis for other wounded soldiers. Manufacturing operations for J.E. Hanger, Inc., were established in the cities of Staunton and Richmond. The company eventually moved to Washington, D.C.

Other inventions credited to Hanger include a horseless carriage (used as a toy by his children); an adjustable reclining chair; a water turbine; a Venetian blind; and a lathe used in the manufacturing process for prosthetic limbs.

Hanger married Nora McCarthy in Richmond in 1873. The couple had two daughters (Princetta and Alice) and six sons (James Edward, Herbert Blair, McCarthy, Hugh Hamilton, Henry Hoover and Albert Sidney). The family moved to Washington, D.C., in the 1880s, and their home near Logan Circle still stands today. All of Hanger's sons worked in the family business as adults.

Hanger retired from active management of the company in 1905, however he retained the title of president. In 1915, he traveled to Europe to observe firsthand the latest techniques of European prosthetists. As a result, the company received contracts with both England and France during and after World War I. At the time of Hanger's death in 1919, the company had branches in Atlanta, St. Louis, Philadelphia, Pittsburgh, London and Paris.

Hanger's children and grandchildren, along with in-laws, cousins and other associates, continued operating and expanding the company. By the mid 1950s there were 50 Hanger offices in North America and 25 in Europe. In 1989, J. E. Hanger, Inc. of Washington, D.C., was purchased by Hanger Orthopedic Group, Inc. and became part of their wholly owned subsidiary, Hanger Prosthetics and Orthotics. According to the company's 2007 annual report, net sales for this patient care services segment were $571.7 million. As of 2008, Hanger Prosthetics & Orthotics sees about 650,000 patients annually.
