= Battle of Philippi (1861) =

Early battle of the American Civil War

- Part of the American Civil War
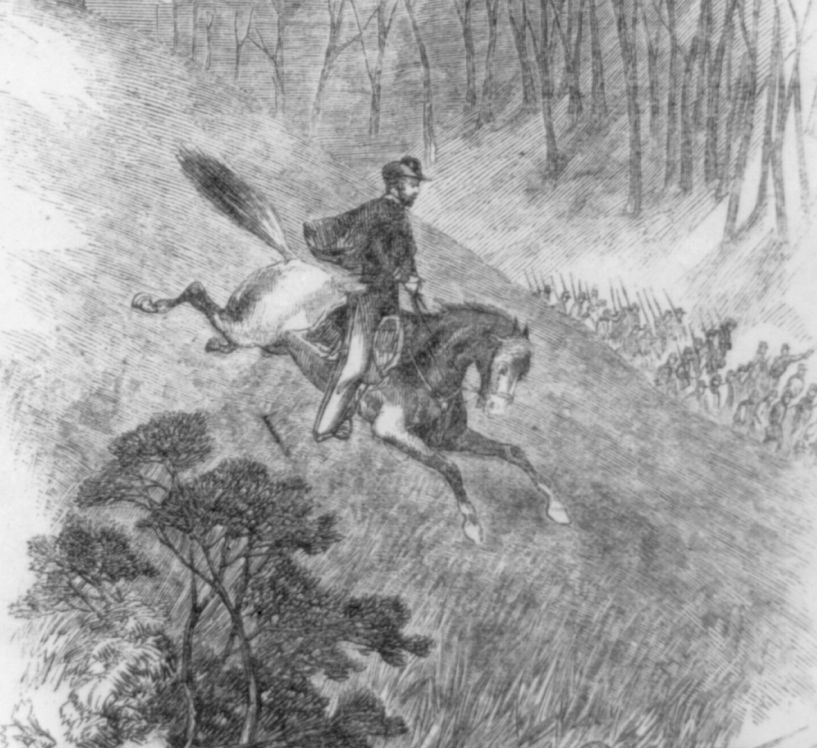
- Daring ride on horseback of Col. Frederick W. Lander, June 3, 1861
Date	June 3, 1861; 165 years ago
Location	Barbour County, Virginia in present-day West Virginia 39.15316°N 80.04278°W
Result	Union victory

Belligerents
United States (Union)	(Confederate States of America) Confederate States (Confederacy)

Commanders and leaders
(United States) Thomas A. Morris (United States) Isaac Duval	(Confederate States of America) George A. Porterfield

Units involved
1st West Virginia Infantry; 2nd West Virginia Infantry (reserve); 6th Indiana Infantry; 7th Indiana Infantry; 9th Indiana Infantry; 14th Ohio Infantry; 16th Ohio Infantry	9th Virginia Infantry Battalion; 25th Virginia Infantry; 31st Virginia Infantry; 11th Virginia Cavalry; 14th Virginia Cavalry

Strength
3,000	800

Casualties and losses
2 wounded [Col Kelley and 1 union soldier] (NPS estimated 4 Union casualties)	2–3 wounded (NPS estimates 26 killed or wounded)

The Battle of Philippi formed part of the Western Virginia Campaign of the American Civil War and was fought in and around Philippi, Virginia (now West Virginia), on June 3, 1861. A Union Army victory, it was the first organized land action of the war but is generally viewed as a skirmish rather than a battle.

The Northern press, however, celebrated it as an epic triumph, which encouraged Congress to call for the drive on Richmond that ended with the Union defeat at First Bull Run in July. It brought overnight fame to Maj. Gen. George B. McClellan and was notable for the first battlefield amputations. As the first of a series of victories that pushed Confederate forces out of northwest Virginia, it strengthened the Union government in exile, which would soon create the new state of West Virginia.

As the largely-untrained Confederates had fled the battlefield with barely any resistance, the Union jokingly referred to the engagement as the Philippi Races.

== Background ==
After the commencement of hostilities at Fort Sumter in April 1861, Maj. Gen. George B. McClellan returned to the Army and on May 13 assumed command of the Department of the Ohio, headquartered in Cincinnati, Ohio. McClellan planned an offensive into what is now the State of West Virginia (at the time the northwestern counties of the Commonwealth of Virginia) which he hoped would lead to a campaign against the Confederate capital of Richmond, Virginia. His immediate objectives were to occupy the territory to protect the largely pro-Union populace in the counties along the Ohio River, and to keep open the Baltimore and Ohio Railroad line, a critical supply line for the Union.

On May 26, McClellan, in response to the burning of bridges on the Baltimore and Ohio Railroad near Farmington, West Virginia, ordered Col. Benjamin Franklin Kelley of the (Union) 1st West Virginia Infantry with his regiment and Company A of the 2nd West Virginia Infantry, to advance from Wheeling to the area and safeguard the important bridge over the Monongahela River at Fairmont, a distance of about 70 miles (110 km) southeast of Wheeling. Kelley's men were supported by the 16th Ohio Infantry under Col. James Irvine. After securing Fairmont, the 1st West Virginia advanced again and seized the important railroad junction of Grafton, about 15 miles (24 km) southeast of Fairmont, on May 30. McClellan confided to Winfield Scott on June 4 that he had used the western Virginia regiments to avoid claims of interference in Virginia affairs, but told Scott that "comparatively few of the Virginia troops thus far raised," such as those in Kelley's command, were really Virginians but "mostly from Penna and Ohio."

Meanwhile, the 14th Ohio Infantry Regiment, under Col. James B. Steedman, was ordered to occupy Parkersburg and then proceed to Grafton, about 90 miles (140 km) to the east. By May 28, McClellan had ordered a total of about 3,000 troops into Western Virginia and placed them under the overall command of Brig. Gen. Thomas A. Morris, commander of Indiana Volunteers.

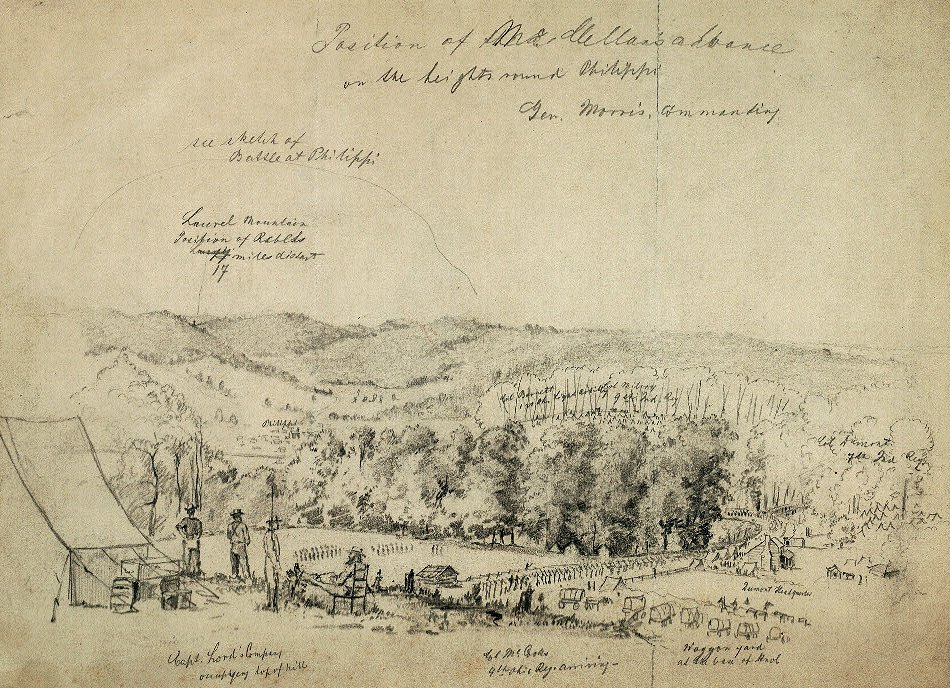
Position of McClellan's Advance on the Heights Round Philippi. (This contemporary soldier's sketch shows the disposition of some of Morris's troops just northwest of Philippi on the threshold of the battle.)

On May 4 Confederate Col. George A. Porterfield had been assigned command of the state forces in northwestern Virginia and ordered to Grafton to take charge of enlistments in the area. As the Union columns advanced, Porterfield's poorly armed 800 recruits retreated to Philippi, about 17 miles (27 km) south of Grafton. Philippi was the county seat of Barbour County, which had voted in favor of Virginia's secession ordinance. A palmetto secession flag had been flying above the courthouse since January, 1861. At Philippi, a covered bridge spanned the Tygart Valley River and was an important segment of the vital Beverly–Fairmont Turnpike.

While Porterfield had a command of regimental strength it was composed of independent companies that had not yet been formally organized into regiments. Most were local recruits from Taylor, Pocahontas, Upshur, Hardy, Pendleton, Harrison, Barbour, Marion and the Valley counties of Augusta, Bath, Rockbridge, and Highland. The companies were the Letcher Guards, Pocahontas Rescues, Upshur Grays, Franklin Guards, Hardy Blues, Marion Guards, Harrison Rifles, Highland County Highlanders, Barbour Grays, Potomac Guards, Bath Grays, Second Rockbridge Dragoons, Churchville Cavalry and the Barbour Lighthorse Cavalry. These companies were eventually organized into the 25th Virginia Infantry, the 31st Virginia Infantry, The 11th Virginia Cavalry and the 14th Virginia Cavalry, with the Barbour Lighthorse Cavalry disbanding after the battle.

== Battle ==
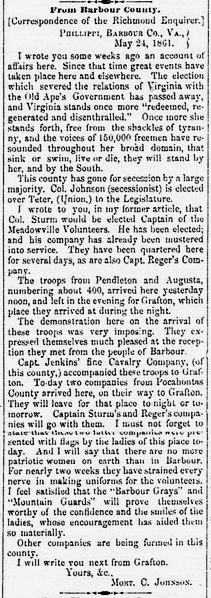
Richmond Enquirer June 11, 1861, Confederate troops at Grafton, Va.

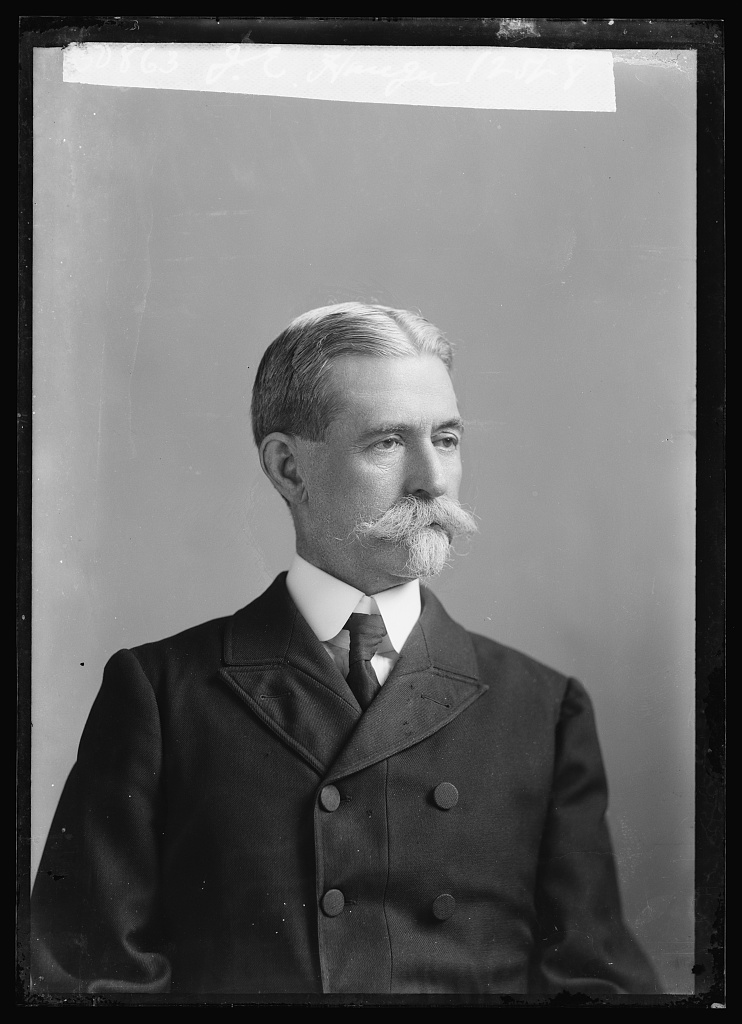
James Edward Hangar

Col. Kelley devised a two-prong attack against the Confederate force in Philippi, approved by Gen. Morris on his arrival in Grafton on June 1. The principal advance would be 1,600 men led by Kelley himself, and would include six companies of his own regiment, nine of the 9th Indiana Infantry Regiment under Col. Robert H. Milroy, and six of the 16th Ohio Infantry. To deceive the enemy into thinking the objective was Harpers Ferry, they departed by train to the east. They disembarked at the small village of Thornton and marched south on a back road on the same side of the river as Philippi, intending to arrive at the rear of the town.

Meanwhile, the 7th Indiana under Col. Ebenezer Dumont were sent to Webster, about 3.5 miles (5.6 km) southwest of Grafton. They would unite with the 6th Indiana under Col. Thomas T. Crittenden and the 14th Ohio under Col. Steedman. The column, with a total of 1,400 men under Col. Dumont (with the assistance of Col. Frederick W. Lander, volunteer aide-de-camp to Gen. McClellan), would march directly south from Webster on the Turnpike. In this way, the Union force would execute a double envelopment of the outnumbered Confederates.

On June 2, the Union columns set off to converge on Philippi. After an overnight march in rainy weather, both arrived at Philippi before dawn the following morning. Morris had planned a predawn assault to be signaled by a pistol shot. The green Confederate volunteers had failed to establish picket lines for perimeter security, choosing instead to escape the cold rain and stay inside their tents. A Confederate sympathizer, Mrs. Thomas Humphreys, saw the approaching Union troops and sent her young son on horseback to warn the Confederates. As Mrs. Humphreys watched, she saw Union pickets capture her son and fired her pistol at them. She missed, but her shots began the attack prematurely.

The Union attackers began firing their artillery, which awakened the Confederates from their slumber. Those who were armed fired a few shots at the advancing bluecoats, then Southerners broke and began running to the south, some still in their bed clothes. That caused Union journalists to refer to the battle as the "Races at Philippi." Dumont's soldiers entered the town from the bridge (Col. Lander's ride down the steep hillside through heavy underbrush was considered such a feat of horsemanship that Leslie's Weekly gave an illustrated account of it shortly afterward), but Kelley's column had arrived from the north on the wrong road and were unable to block the Confederate retreat. Kelley himself was shot while pursuing some of the retreating Confederates, but Col. Lander chased down and captured the man who shot Kelley. The Confederates retreated to Huttonsville, about 45 miles (72 km) to the south.

== Aftermath ==
Philippi was the first organized land action in the war (the impromptu Battle of Fairfax Court House, two days earlier, could not be counted as such), and Union victory in this relatively bloodless battle propelled McClellan into the national spotlight. The Northern press, hungry for battle stories, presented it as an epic triumph, encouraging politicians to demand the big advance on Richmond, which became Bull Run.

The civilian population of Philippi were the first in western Virginia to feel the devastation of the war. The town was primarily secessionist in sentiment, and many had fled south with as many of their valuables as they could carry in fear of the Federal advance. In July, a month after the battle, it was reported that "with the exception of our troop [Philippi] is almost deserted, only three families having as yet returned, among them is Mr. Wilson and family, one of the most influential families in Barbour county."

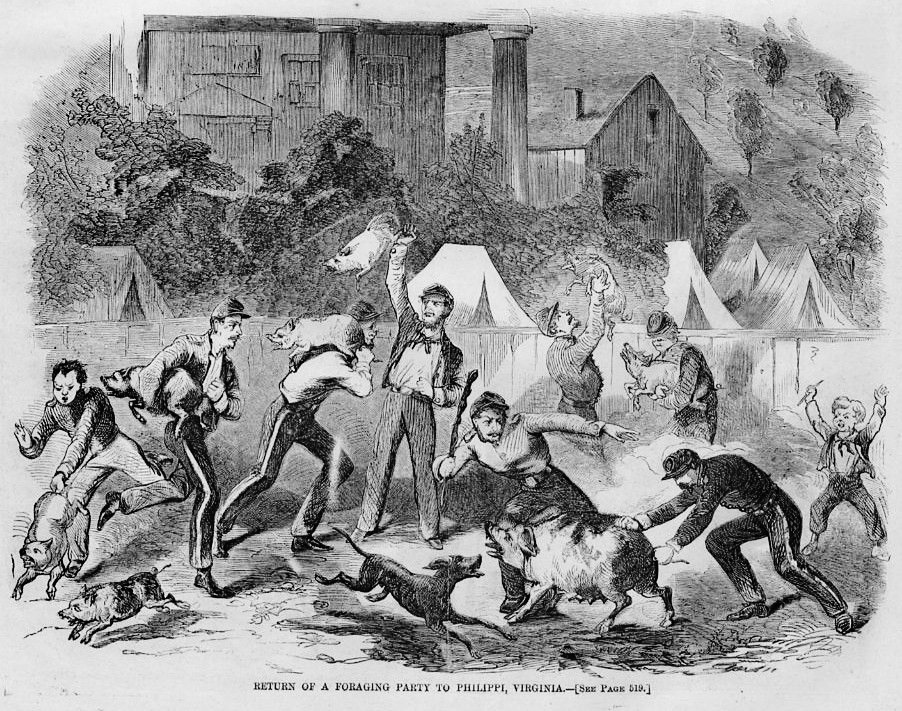
"Return of a Foraging Party to Philippi, Virginia," Harper's Weekly, August 17, 1861

A correspondent of the Cincinnati Times wrote "The village bears more than any other I have seen, the ruinous effect of the war. Many of the houses have been sacked and maliciously damaged. Not the half of them are now occupied, the inhabitants having fled. It was a rabid secession town, and the women yet lean strongly that way." A record book of soldier violations was found a few months after the battle containing the following entries: "Edward F. Grant enters a complaint against Colonel McCook's 9th Ohio Regiment for breaking into the houses of Haynes and Hovatter, June 25, 1 p.m." "Two privates in the guard house for stealing glassware and vegetables." "Four men in the guard house for theft. Discharged." "Ninety-six men in guard house for breaking into dwellings and houses." Many of the men of Philippi had left before or just after the battle, some not returning until after the war and leaving the women to care for families and property.

There were two significant Confederate casualties. Both were treated with battlefield amputations, which are believed to be the first such operations of the war. One was a Virginia Military Institute cadet, Fauntleroy Daingerfield. The other Confederate was James E. Hanger, an 18-year-old college student. After recovering and being released, Hanger returned home to Virginia. He made an artificial leg from barrel staves with a hinge at the knee. His design worked so well that the Virginia State Legislature commissioned him to manufacture the “Hanger Limb” for other wounded soldiers. After the war, Hanger patented his prosthetic device and founded what is now the Hanger Orthopedic Group, Inc. As of 2007, Hanger Orthopedic Group is the United States market leader in the manufacture of artificial limbs.

Following the battle, Col. Porterfield was replaced in command of Confederate forces in western Virginia by Brig. Gen. Robert S. Garnett.

The short-story writer and satirist Ambrose Bierce (1842–ca. 1914) was a Union recruit at the Battle of Philippi. Twenty years later, he wrote, in an autobiographical fragment he called On a Mountain:

We gave ourselves, this aristocracy of service, no end of military airs; some of us even going to the extreme of keeping our jackets buttoned and our hair combed. We had been in action, too; had shot off a Confederate leg at Philippi, "the first battle of the war," and had lost as many as a dozen men at Laurel Hill and Carrick's Ford, whither the enemy had fled in trying, Heaven knows why, to get away from us.

The quotation marks indicate the wryness with which Bierce and his fellow veterans, who were to undergo far more harrowing fights, must have regarded the designation of "first battle."

== See also ==
- Philippi Covered Bridge, used by both sides during the battle.
