= 16th Ohio Infantry Regiment =

Union Army regiment

- Active: May 3, 1861, to August 18, 1861 (3 months); September 23, 1861, to October 31, 1864 (3 years)
- Country: United States
- Allegiance: Union
- Branch: Union Army
- Type: Infantry
- Engagements: Battle of Philippi; Skirmish at Bowman's Place; Battle of Rich Mountain; Battle of Chickasaw Bayou; Battle of Fort Hindman; Battle of Grand Gulf; Battle of Champion Hill; Battle of Big Black River Bridge; Siege of Vicksburg (May 19 & May 22 assaults); Siege of Jackson; Red River Campaign

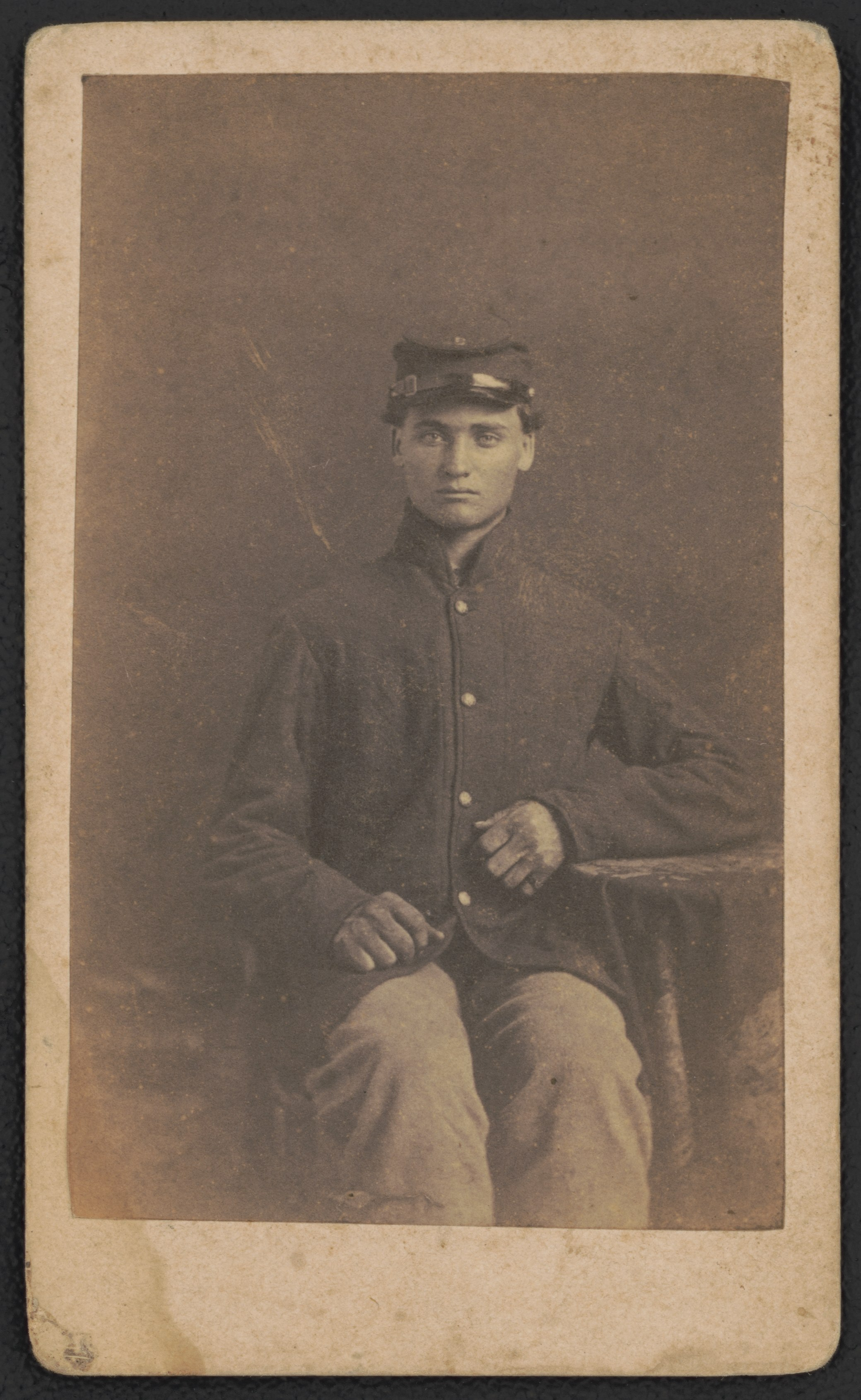
Private Thomas J. Eagle of Co. I, 16th Ohio Infantry Regiment

The 16th Ohio Infantry Regiment was an infantry regiment in the Union Army during the American Civil War.

== Service ==
=== Three-months regiment ===
The 16th Ohio Infantry Regiment was organized at Columbus, Ohio, in response to President Lincoln's call for 75,000 volunteers and mustered into service on May 3, 1861, under the command of Colonel James Irvine. The regiment moved to western Virginia, May 25, and occupied Grafton on May 30. It participated in the West Virginia Campaign June 1-July 17, seeing action at Phillippi June 3. The regiment was reported at Bowman's Place June 29 and was involved in the pursuit of Garnett July 7–12. Ordered back to Columbus and mustered out August 18, 1861.

=== Three-years regiment ===
The 16th Ohio Infantry was reorganized at Zanesville, Ohio, Camp Tiffin in Wooster, Ohio, and Camp Chase in Columbus beginning September 23, 1861, and mustered in for three years service on December 2, 1861, under the command of Colonel John F. DeCourcey.

The regiment was attached to 12th Brigade, Army of the Ohio, to March 1862. 26th Brigade, 7th Division, Army of the Ohio, to October 1862. 4th Brigade, Cumberland Gap Division, District of West Virginia, Department of the Ohio, to November 1862. 3rd Brigade, 9th Division, Right Wing, XIII Corps, Department of the Tennessee, to December 1862. 3rd Brigade, 3rd Division, Sherman's Yazoo Expedition, to January 1863. 3rd Brigade, 9th Division, XIII Corps, Army of the Tennessee, to February 1863. 2nd Brigade, 9th Division, XIII Corps, to July 1863. 4th Brigade, 1st Division, XIII Corps, Department of the Tennessee, to August 1863, and Department of the Gulf to September 1863. 3rd Brigade, 1st Division, XIII Corps, Department of the Gulf, to March 1864. 2nd Brigade, 1st Division, XIII Corps, to June 1864. 2nd Brigade, 3rd Division, XIX Corps, to October 1864.

The 16th Ohio Infantry mustered out of service at Columbus, Ohio, on October 31, 1864, on the expiration of the term of service. Recruits were transferred to the 114th Ohio Infantry.

== Detailed service ==
Moved to Camp Dennison, Ohio, November 28, then to Lexington, Ky., December 19. Moved to Somerset, Ky., January 12, 1862. March to support of Gen. Thomas at battle of Mill Springs, Ky., January 18–20, 1862. Duty at Somerset until January 31. March to London, then to Cumberland Ford January 31-February 12, repairing and rebuilding roads. Reconnaissance toward Cumberland Gap March 21–23. Skirmish at Elrod's Ridge March 22. Cumberland Gap Campaign March 28-June 18. Cumberland Mountain April 28. Cumberland Gap April 29. Occupation of Cumberland Gap June 18-September 15. Action at Wilson's Gap June 18. Tazewell July 26 and August 6. Operations about Cumberland Gap September 2–6. Evacuation of Cumberland Gap and retreat to the Ohio River September 17-October 3. Action at West Liberty September 26. Expedition to Charleston, W. Va., October 21-November 10. Ordered to Memphis, Tenn.. November 10. Sherman's Yazoo Expedition December 20, 1862, to January 3, 1863. Chickasaw Bayou December 26–28, 1862. Chickasaw Bluffs December 29. Expedition to Arkansas Post, Ark., January 3–10, 1863. Assault and capture of Fort Hindman, Arkansas Post, January 10–11. Moved to Young's Point, La., January 15, thence to Milliken's Bend March 8. Operations from Milliken's Bend to New Carthage March 31-April 17. Movement on Bruinsburg, Mississippi, and turning Grand Gulf April 25–30. Battle of Thompson's Hill, Grand Gulf, May 1. Battle of Champion Hill May 16. Big Black River May 17. Siege of Vicksburg, Miss., May 18-July 4. Assaults on Vicksburg May 19 and 22. Advance on Jackson, Miss., July 5–10. Near Clinton July 8. Siege of Jackson July 10–17. Ordered to New Orleans, La., August 13, and duty there until September 6. At Brashear City until October 3. Western Louisiana Campaign October 3-November 18. Moved to DeCrow Point, Matagorda Bay, Texas, November 18–28, and duty there until January 1864, and at Matagorda Island until April. Moved to New Orleans, La., April 18, then to Alexandria, La., April 23. Red River Campaign April 26-May 22. Construction of dam at Alexandria April 30-May 10. Graham's Plantation April 5. Retreat to Morganza May 13–20. Mansura May 16. Expedition to the Atchafalaya May 30-June 6. Duty at Morganza until October. Ordered to Columbus, Ohio, October 6.

== Casualties ==
The regiment lost a total of 286 men during service; 2 officers and 68 enlisted men killed or mortally wounded, 4 officers and 217 enlisted men died of disease.

== Commanders ==
- Colonel James Irvine (3 months regiment)
- Colonel John Fitzroy De Courcy, 31st Baron Kingsale - resigned March 3, 1864
- Captain Eli W. Botsford - commanded at the battle of Champion Hill

== See also ==
- List of Ohio Civil War units
- Ohio in the Civil War
