= 31st Virginia Infantry Regiment =

- Flag of Virginia, 1861
- Active: July 1861 – April 1865
- Disbanded: April 1865
- Country: Confederacy
- Allegiance: Confederate States of America
- Branch: Confederate States Army
- Type: Infantry
- Engagements: American Civil War: Battle of Philippi (1861); Battle of Cheat Mountain; Jackson's Valley Campaign; Seven Days' Battles; Second Battle of Bull Run; Battle of Antietam; Battle of Fredericksburg; Battle of Chancellorsville; Battle of Gettysburg; Battle of Cold Harbor; Siege of Petersburg; Valley Campaigns of 1864; Appomattox Campaign

Commanders
- Notable commanders: William Lowther Jackson

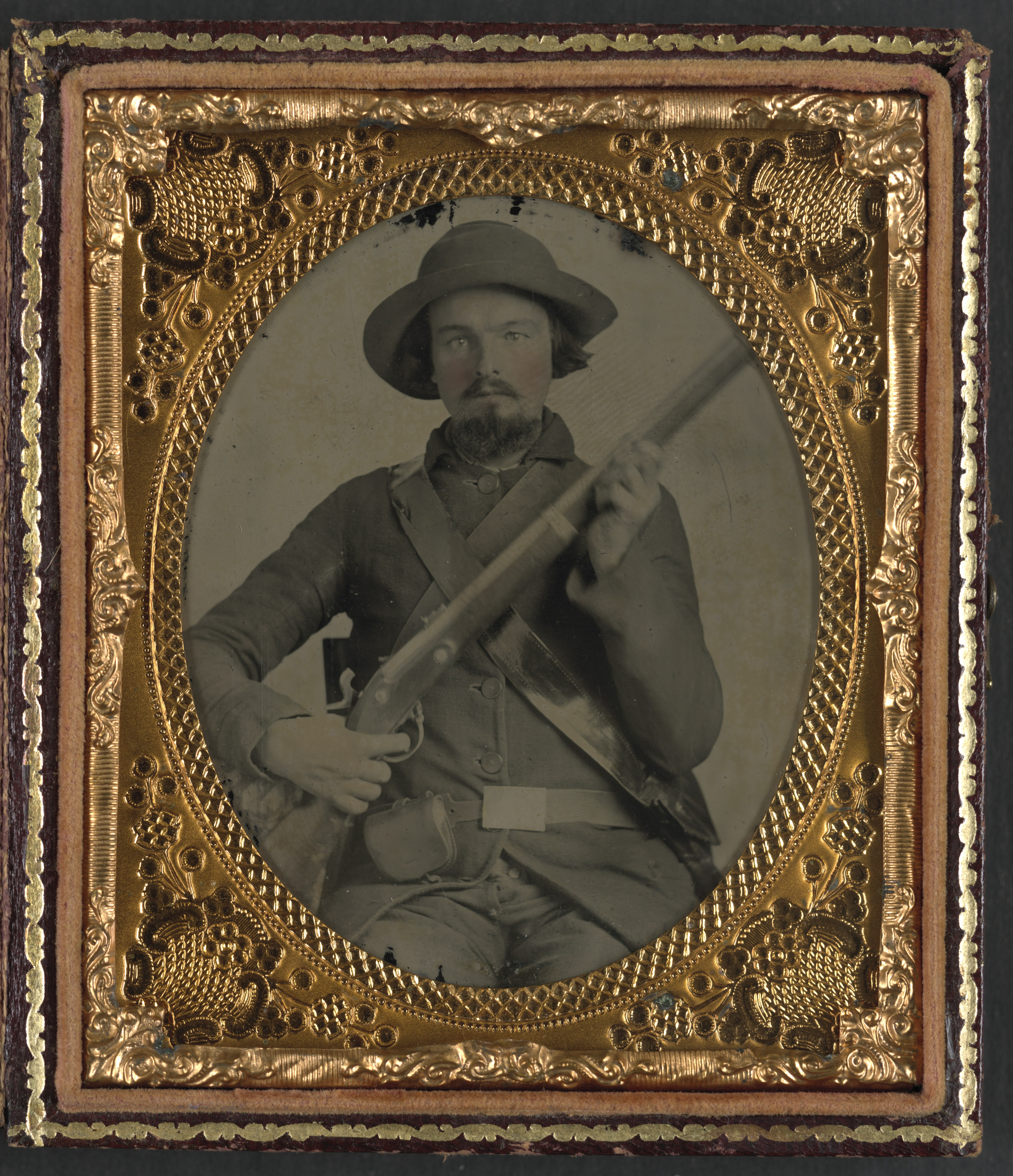
Private Elijah S. Leach of Co. B, 31st Virginia Infantry Regiment

The 31st Virginia Infantry Regiment was an infantry regiment raised in Virginia for service in the Confederate States Army during the American Civil War. It fought mostly as part of the Army of Northern Virginia.

The 31st Virginia was organized under William Lowther Jackson and mustered into Confederate service in July, 1861. The men were recruited primarily from the counties of Barbour, Marion, Pendleton, Harrison, Gilmer, Randolph, Pocahontas, Lewis, and Highland.

The unit was active in Lee's Cheat Mountain Campaign and Jackson's Valley operations. Later it was assigned to General Early's, W. Smith's, Pegram's, and J.A. Walker's Brigade, Army of Northern Virginia. The 31st participated in the difficult campaigns of the army from the Seven Days' Battles to Cold Harbor, then moved with Early to the Shenandoah Valley and was active around Appomattox.

This regiment reported 13 casualties at Greenbrier River, 37 at Camp Alleghany, 19 at McDowell, and 97 at Cross Keys and Port Republic. It lost 3 killed and 17 wounded at Cedar Mountain, had 5 killed and 20 wounded at Second Manassas, and suffered 1 killed and 7 wounded at Sharpsburg. Of the 267 in action at Gettysburg, ten percent were disabled. On April 9, 1865, it surrendered with 7 officers and 49 men of which 22 were armed.

The field officers were Colonels John S. Hoffman, William L. Jackson, and Samuel H. Reynolds; Lieutenant Colonels Francis M. Boykin, Alfred H. Jackson, and J.S. Kerr McCutchen; and Majors James C. Arbogast, Joseph H. Chenoweth, and William P. Cooper.

== Companies ==
- Company A, Marion Guard, Capt. William P. Thompson
- Company B, Pendleton Minute Men, Capt. Robert H. Bradshaw
- Company C, Harrison State Guards, Capt. Uriel M. Turner
- Company D, Gilmer Rifles, Capt. John E. Mitchell
- Company E, The Highlanders, Capt. Felix H. Hull
- Company F, Capt. Jacob Currence (Randolph County)
- Company G, Pocahontas Reserves, Capt. James C. Arbogast
- Company H, Barbour Greys, Capt. Thomas A. Bradford
- Company I, Capt. Alfred H. Jackson (Lewis County)
- Company K, Barbour Mountain Guards, Capt. Henry Sturm

== See also ==
- List of Virginia Civil War units
- List of West Virginia Civil War Confederate units
