= Thomas A. Morris =

American railroad executive, civil engineer and soldier

Thomas Armstrong Morris
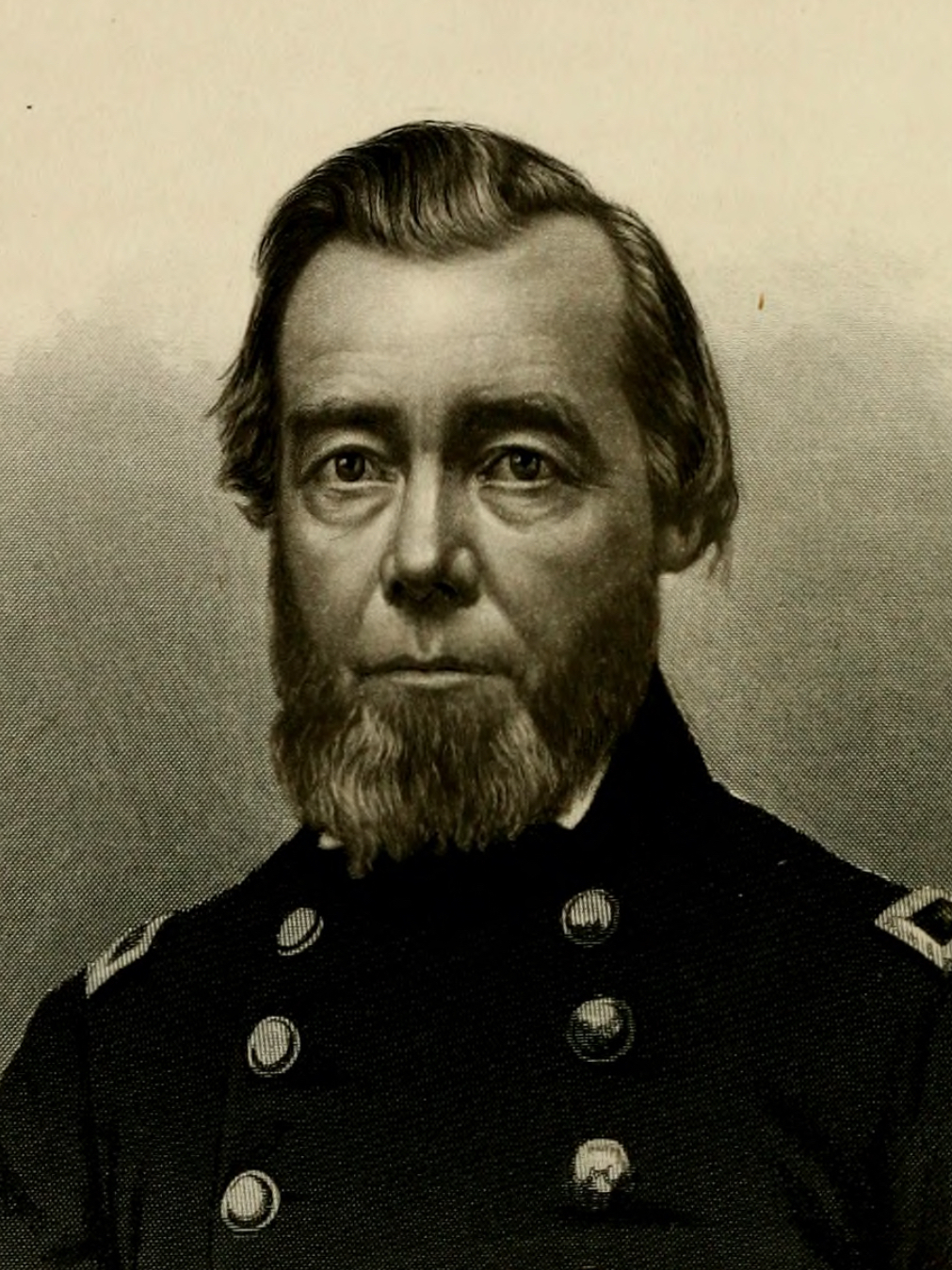
- Born: December 26, 1811; Nicholas County, Kentucky
- Died: March 22, 1904 (aged 92); San Diego, California
- Burial place: Crown Hill National Cemetery and Arboretum, Section 37, Lot 597, Indianapolis, Indiana
- Military career
- Allegiance: United States of America; Union
- Branch: United States Army; Indiana Militia (Union)
- Service years: 1834–1836, 1861
- Rank: Brigadier General (Indiana Militia)
- Conflicts: American Civil War; Western Virginia campaign; Battle of Philippi (1861); Battle of Rich Mountain; Battle of Corrick's Ford

Thomas Armstrong Morris (December 26, 1811 – March 22, 1904) was an American railroad executive and civil engineer from Kentucky and a soldier, serving as a brigadier general of the Indiana Militia in service to the Union during the early months of the American Civil War. During the Western Virginia Campaign in 1861, he played an important role in leading regiments from West Virginia, Indiana, and Ohio in clearing the Confederate army from western Virginia during the Battle of Philippi, a move that helped bolster pro-Union sentiment and contributed to the creation of the separate state of West Virginia. Morris was also instrumental in the planning and construction of the Reconstruction era Indiana State House.

== Biography ==
Thomas Morris was born in Nicholas County, Kentucky. He was one of three sons of Rachel and Morris Morris, an Indianapolis pioneer who moved to central Indiana from Kentucky and later became the Indiana State Auditor.

Young Morris was educated in the local schools and was apprenticed at the age of twelve in the print room of Indianapolis's first newspaper. Three years later, he resumed his studies. In June 1830, he accepted an appointment to the United States Military Academy at West Point, New York. He graduated fourth in the Class of 1834 and became an officer in the 1st U.S. Artillery stationed at Fort Monroe in Virginia and then at Fort King in Florida. He served in several engineering capacities, including in Indiana where he helped extend the National Road into Illinois. He resigned from the army to accept the role as the state's Resident Engineer and supervised the construction of the Central Canal, the Madison and Indianapolis Railroad, and the Terre Haute and Richmond Railroad. He later served as the president of the Bee Line and then the Indianapolis and Cincinnati Railroad. Morris also became a colonel in the Indiana state militia.

At the start of the Civil War, Governor of Indiana Oliver Morton appointed Morris as the quartermaster general of the state's troops. On April 27, 1861, he was appointed brigadier general in the Indiana state militia. Soon, Morris took command of a brigade of newly raised Indiana state troops and led them into western Virginia. His troops became known as the "Indiana Brigade" and were attached to the Department of the Ohio under fellow railroader George B. McClellan. Morris was the overall Union commander at the Battle of Philippi. He fought in several other engagements in West Virginia including the battles at Rich Mountain, Laurel Hill and Corrick's Ford. Around noon on July 13, 1861, Morris attacked the rear guard of the retreating Confederate forces at Corrick's Ford on the Cheat River. Morris's men pursued the Rebels for several miles in a running skirmish before finally routing them after killing Confederate General Robert S. Garnett. The victory helped secure western Virginia for the Union. He mustered out of the militia on July 27, 1861.

Morris declined appointments to the rank of brigadier general of US Volunteers in September 1862, and to major general of US Volunteers in October 1862. He instead returned to the railroad industry, becoming president of the Indianapolis and St. Louis Railroad in 1868. In 1877, he was a commissioner overseeing the construction of the Indiana State House, which was built in 1880. He also oversaw the construction of the Union Railway and Union Depot in Indianapolis, and was president of the Indianapolis Water Company from 1888 until his death.

Morris died at his daughter's home in San Diego, California, at the age of 92 and was buried in Indianapolis.
