= Robert S. Garnett =

Confederate general of the American Civil War (1819-1861)

Robert Selden Garnett
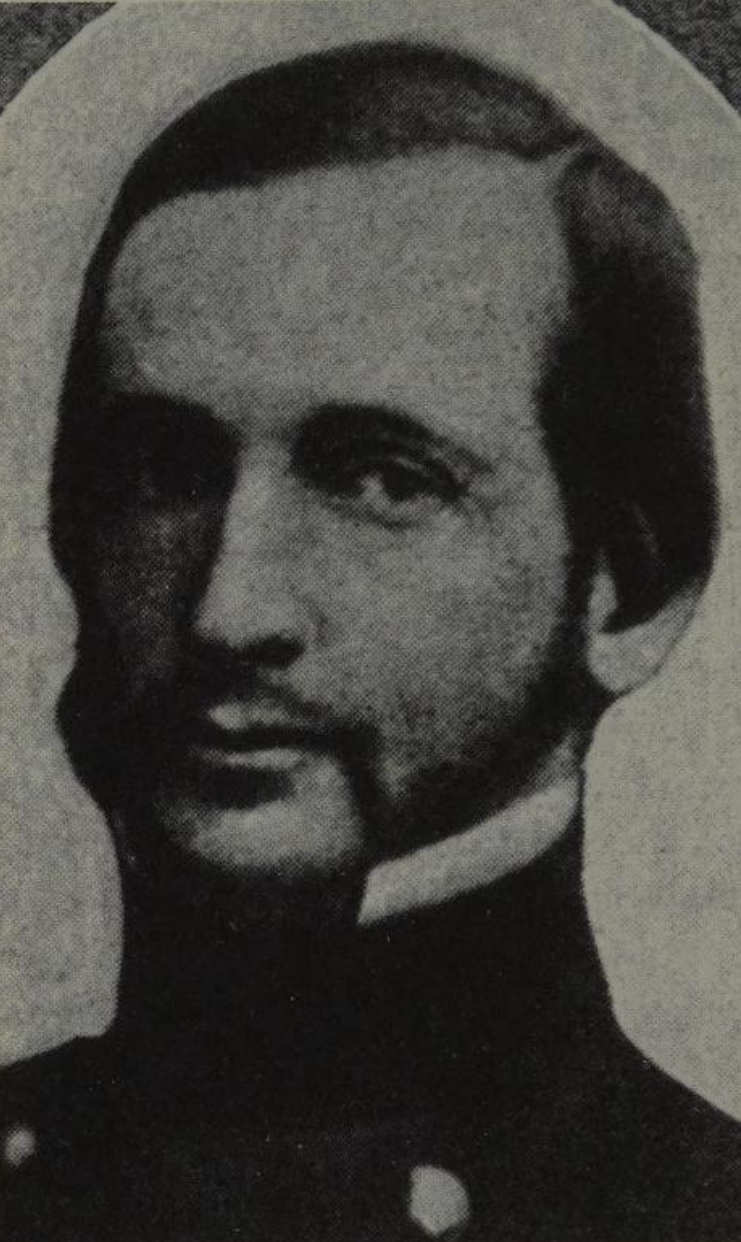
- Although sometimes identified as Richard B. Garnett; it is in fact a picture of Robert Selden Garnett. See p. 135 Vol. 1 Battles and Leaders of the Civil War series for a sketch of Garnett in CSA uniform based on this photograph
- Born: December 16, 1819; Essex County, Virginia
- Died: July 13, 1861 (aged 41); Corrick's Ford, Tucker County, Virginia (now West Virginia)
- Military career
- Allegiance: United States of America; Confederate States of America
- Branch: United States Army; Confederate States Army
- Service years: 1841–61 (USA); 1861 (CSA)
- Rank: Major (USA); Brigadier general (CSA)
- Conflicts: Mexican–American War: Battle of Monterrey; Battle of Buena Vista; Indian Wars; Seminole Wars; Yakima War; American Civil War: Battle of Rich Mountain; Battle of Corrick's Ford †

Robert Selden Garnett (December 16, 1819 – July 13, 1861) was a career military officer, serving in the United States Army until the American Civil War, when he became a Confederate States Army brigadier general. He was the first general officer killed in the Civil War.

== Early life and career ==
Garnett, the son of Robert Selden Garnett Sr. (1789–1840), and Charlotte Olympia De Gouges (1796–1856), was born at the family plantation in Essex County, Virginia. Through his mother, he was a great-grandson of French playwright and activist Olympes de Gouges. Along with his cousin, Richard B. Garnett, Robert attended the United States Military Academy in West Point, New York, graduating 27th in a class of 52. Seven classmates, including his cousin, would die in combat in the Civil War. Another notable cousin of the Garnetts was United States Congressman Robert M. T. Hunter, who went on to become a Senator in the Confederate Congress and Secretary of State of the Confederacy.

Upon his graduation from West Point, Garnett was assigned as a second lieutenant in the 4th U.S. Artillery in July 1841. He spent a year on the Northern Frontier during the Canada Border Disturbances, serving in Buffalo and Fort Ontario in New York before being assigned garrison duty at Fort Monroe in his native Virginia. In 1843 Garnett became an assistant tactics instructor at West Point before becoming an army recruiter and then an Aide-de-camp to General John E. Wool. Garnett served in the Mexican–American War under Zachary Taylor and received two brevets for distinguished service, one at the Battle of Monterrey and the other for "Gallant and Meritorious Conduct" in the Battle of Buena Vista.

In 1848, Garnett transferred to the 7th U.S. Infantry and served in the Seminole Wars in Florida before heading to the Presidio of Monterey, California. In 1849, then Major Garnett designed what would become the Great Seal of California. After a brief stint on a review board in Washington, D.C., he served on the frontier in Texas, being promoted to captain. He returned to West Point as Commandant of Cadets before being transferred to garrison duty in Virginia. Being named a captain in the 1st U.S. Cavalry, he once again served on the frontier. The much traveled Garnett was promoted to major of the 9th U.S. Infantry and went west to the Washington Territory, where he served in the 1856 Yakima Expedition and the 1858 fighting against the Puget Sound Indians. He designed and supervised the construction of Fort Simcoe. He requested and was granted an extended leave of absence later that year, when his wife and young son died from disease and he returned east to bury their remains. Still in mourning, he was traveling in Europe when the Confederate States of America were formed.

== Civil War ==
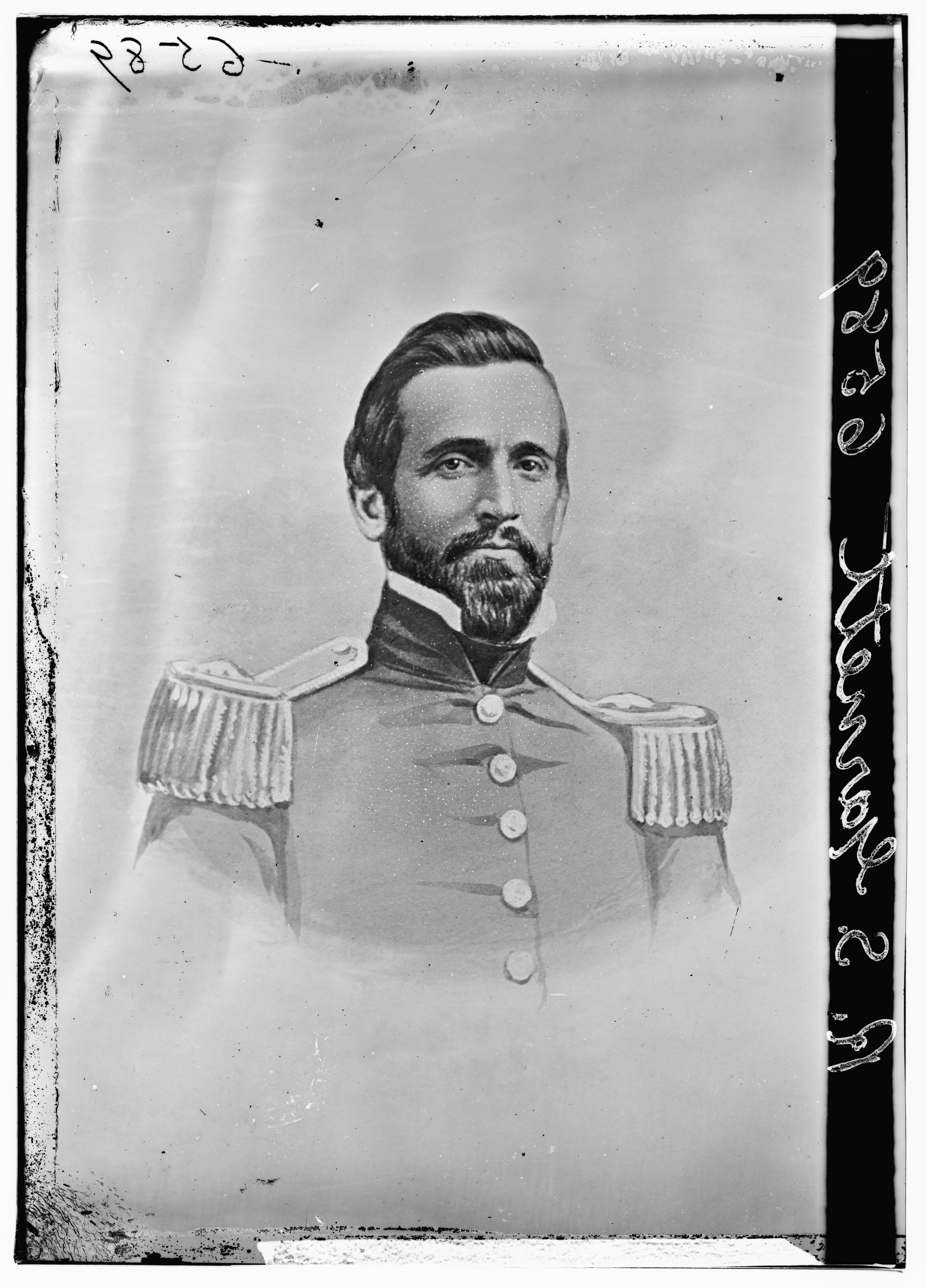
This image, commonly identified as of Richard B. Garnett, is actually of Robert S. Garnett, as can be noted by the reversed script on the right border of the image.

When Virginia seceded from the United States, Garnett resigned his commission in April 1861 and became Adjutant General of the Virginia troops, serving under Robert E. Lee. In June, he was assigned as brigadier general of the Provisional Army. At the start of the Civil War, Union forces had rapidly crossed the Ohio River to seize a portion of northwestern Virginia (now a part of West Virginia), winning a key victory at the Battle of Philippi. On June 15, Lee assigned Garnett to reorganize the Confederate forces in the area. He deployed his forces at strategic points along the Staunton-Parkersburg Turnpike, hoping to defend the vital supply route against Federal troops. A series of small battles occurred, with the Confederates being forced to withdraw under pressure from Maj. Gen. George B. McClellan's Union forces.

After a defeat at Battle of Rich Mountain, Garnett withdrew from his Laurel Hill entrenchments under cover of darkness, hoping to escape to northern Virginia with his 4,500 men. However, he received what later proved to be false information that his escape route to Beverly was blocked by Union troops. He instead marched to the northeast, following ridges and valleys in a more circuitous route. Pursued for several days by as many as 20,000 Federals, Garnett paused at several stream crossings to slow his adversaries. While directing his rear guard in a delaying action at Corrick's Ford, Garnett was shot and killed during a Union volley. A friend in the Union Army recovered his body after Garnett's remaining men had fled. A participant in the battle related his coming upon the body of Gen. Garnett as he was dying and expressed the belief that he had been killed mistakenly by his own men.

== Legacy ==
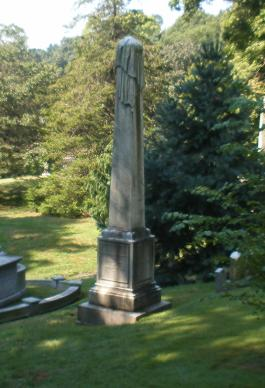
Grave monument for General Garnett, his wife and child, Green-Wood Cemetery

In recognition of Garnett's service during the Mexican–American War, a Federal honor guard conveyed his body under a flag of truce to his relatives, who buried Garnett in Baltimore, Maryland. He was later re-interred next to his wife in Green-Wood Cemetery in Brooklyn, New York, one of two Confederate generals buried there. His grave monument, which he had erected for his wife and child, does not have his name on it. One face mentions his wife, one face his son, and one face has the words "To My Wife and Child." The fourth face is blank.

In his memoirs of the War, E. Porter Alexander expressed great admiration for Garnett and stated his belief that if he had lived, Garnett would have become one of the great Confederate generals of the war, stating, "He had been Commandant of the Corps of Cadets during my first year at West Point, and the impression I formed of him as a soldier is not lower than that formed of any other officer I have ever known. In every one else I have seen some mere human traits, but in Garnett every trait was purely military. Had he lived, I am sure he would have been one of our great generals."

In California, the General Robert S. Garnett Chapter 2570 of the United Daughters of the Confederacy was named in his memory and honor. In 1957, they established a monument to Garnett, who had designed California's State Seal during his brief service at the Presidio in Monterey in 1849. In 2017, after the Unite the Right rally in Charlottesville, Virginia, the city of Monterey installed a new plaque omitting mention of Garnett's Confederate history; it was stolen in 2020. There is a Sons of Confederate Veterans camp in West Virginia named Robert Garnett Camp 1470 in his honor.

== See also ==
- List of American Civil War generals (Confederate)
