= Battle of Corrick's Ford =

Battle of the American Civil War

Coordinates: 39°05′16″N 79°41′06″W

- Part of the American Civil War
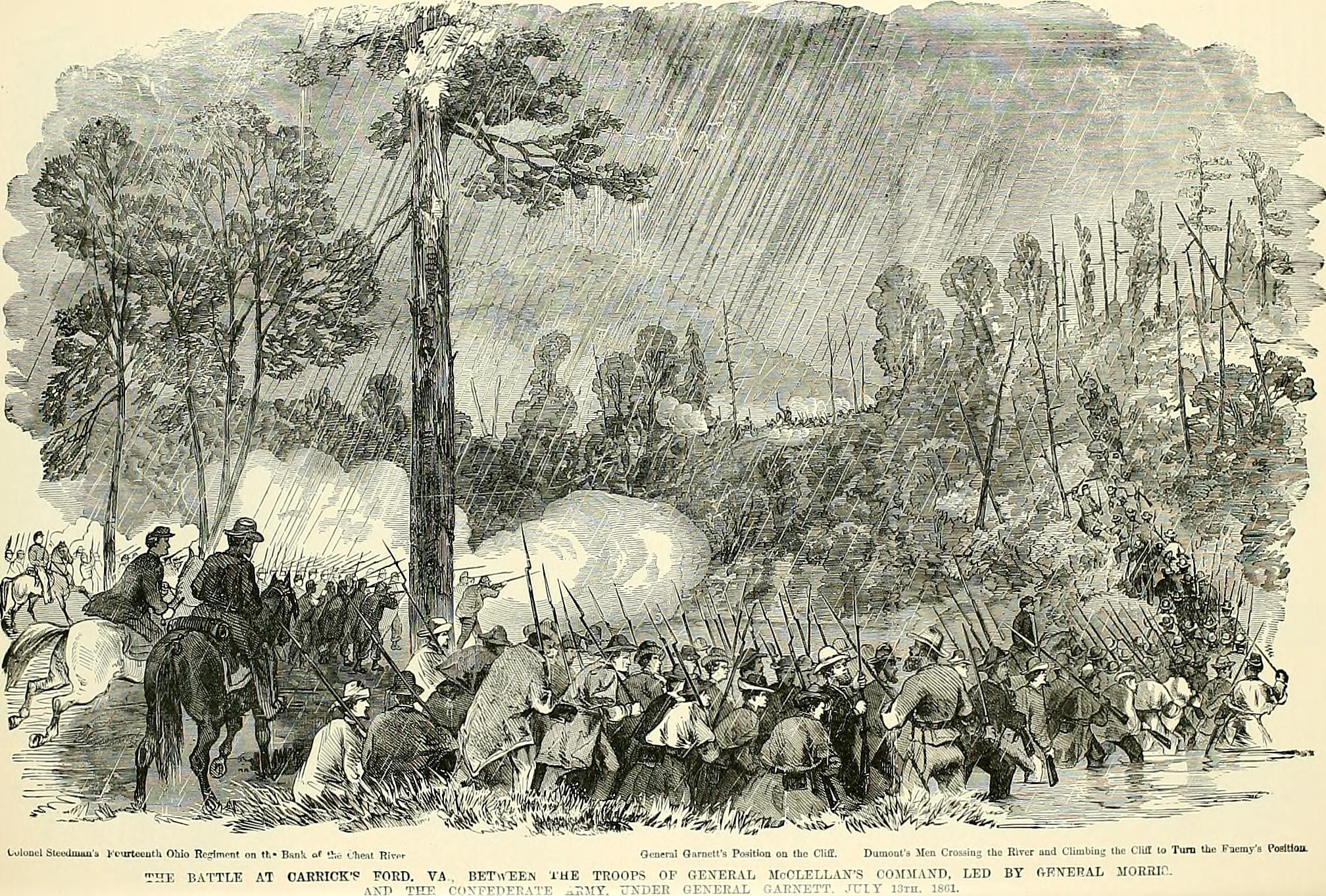
| Date | July 13, 1861 |
| Location | Tucker County, Virginia (now West Virginia) |
| Result | Union victory |

Belligerents
| United States of America | Confederate States of America |

Commanders and leaders
| George B. McClellan; William S. Rosecrans; Thomas A. Morris | Robert S. Garnett † |

Strength
| 2,200 | 3,000 |

Casualties and losses
| 53 | 80 |

The Battle of Corrick's Ford took place on July 13, 1861, on the Cheat River in western Virginia (now the state of West Virginia) as part of the Operations in Western Virginia Campaign during the American Civil War. By later standards, the battle was a minor skirmish. Often deemed as a final part of the Battle of Rich Mountain, it was the end of a series of battles between the forces of Union Maj. Gen. George B. McClellan and Confederate Brig. Gen. Robert S. Garnett.

== Battle ==
McClellan had defeated part of Garnett's force on July 11, 1861, at the Battle of Rich Mountain. Upon hearing about the defeat, Garnett fell back toward Virginia with approximately 4,500 men around midnight that night. He began to march towards Beverly, but received false information that McClellan's men occupied the town. The Confederates backtracked, abandoned the Staunton and Parkersburg Turnpike at Leadsville, and crossed Cheat Mountain into the Cheat River Valley. Union Brig. Gen. Thomas A. Morris pursued them with his Indiana brigade.

Around noon on July 13, Morris overtook Garnett's rear guard at Corrick's Ford on the Cheat River, and attacked the retreating Confederates. Garnett personally directed the rear guard of the Confederate skirmishers in order to delay the Union attack. He soon withdrew to another ford a mile or two further away. The running skirmish resumed and as Garnett again prepared to retreat, a Union volley killed him instantly. The Confederates fled, abandoning their dead commander, one cannon, and nearly 40 wagons. A friend in the Union Army recovered Garnett's body after the battle. He was the first general officer killed in the Civil War.

Control of western Virginia was now in Union hands and it stayed that way for the rest of the war. The campaign propelled Maj. Gen. George B. McClellan to command of the Army of the Potomac.

== Memorials ==
Two monuments mark the Battle of Corricks Ford. A six-ton boulder affixed with a bronze plaque was dedicated in 1926 and later moved to a site which is now along US Route 219. Another monument to the battle was unveiled at the courthouse in 1938.

== Battlefield preservation ==
The Civil War Trust (a division of the American Battlefield Trust) and its partners have acquired and preserved 26 acres (0.11 km^{2}) of the battlefield.
