= General Crittenden =

General Crittenden may refer to:

- George B. Crittenden (1812–1880), Confederate States Army major general
- Thomas Leonidas Crittenden (1819–1893), Union Army major general
- Thomas Turpin Crittenden (1825–1905), Union Army brigadier general
