= Military leadership in the American Civil War =

Military leadership in the American Civil War was vested in both the political and the military structures of the belligerent powers. The overall military leadership of the United States during the Civil War was ultimately vested in the President of the United States as constitutional commander-in-chief, and in the political heads of the military departments he appointed. Most of the major Union wartime commanders had, however, previous regular army experience. A smaller number of military leaders originated from the United States Volunteers. Some of them derived from nations other than the United States.

In the Southern Confederacy, the constitutional commander-in-chief was educated at West Point and had served in the Mexican- American War. Many officers in the United States Army, most of them educated at West Point at the expense of the United States, and having taken an oath of allegiance to the same, joined the rebellion against it. Several significant Confederate military leaders emerged from state unit commands. Some military leaders derived from countries other than the United States.

== The United States (The Union) ==
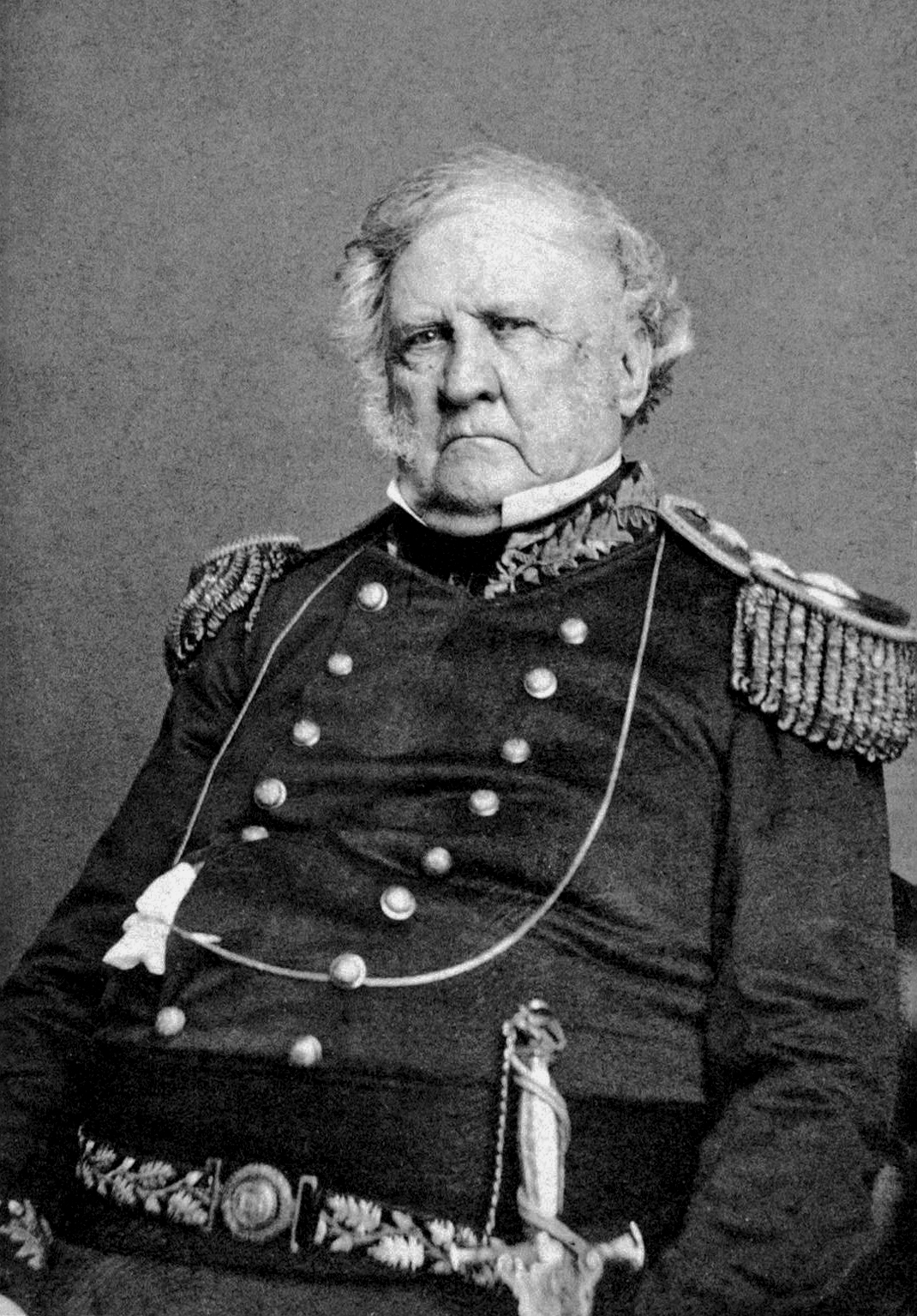
Winfield Scott

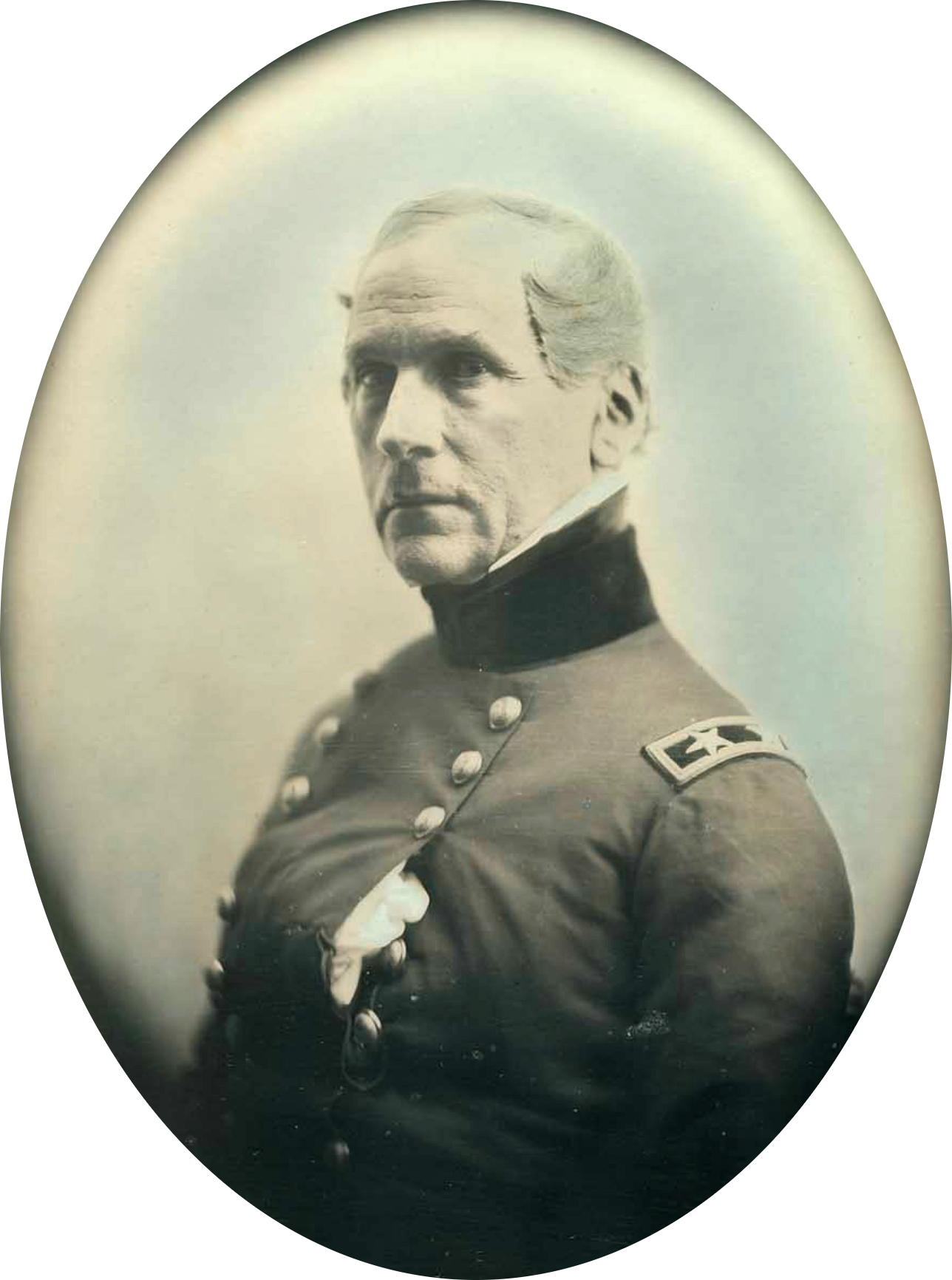
John E. Wool

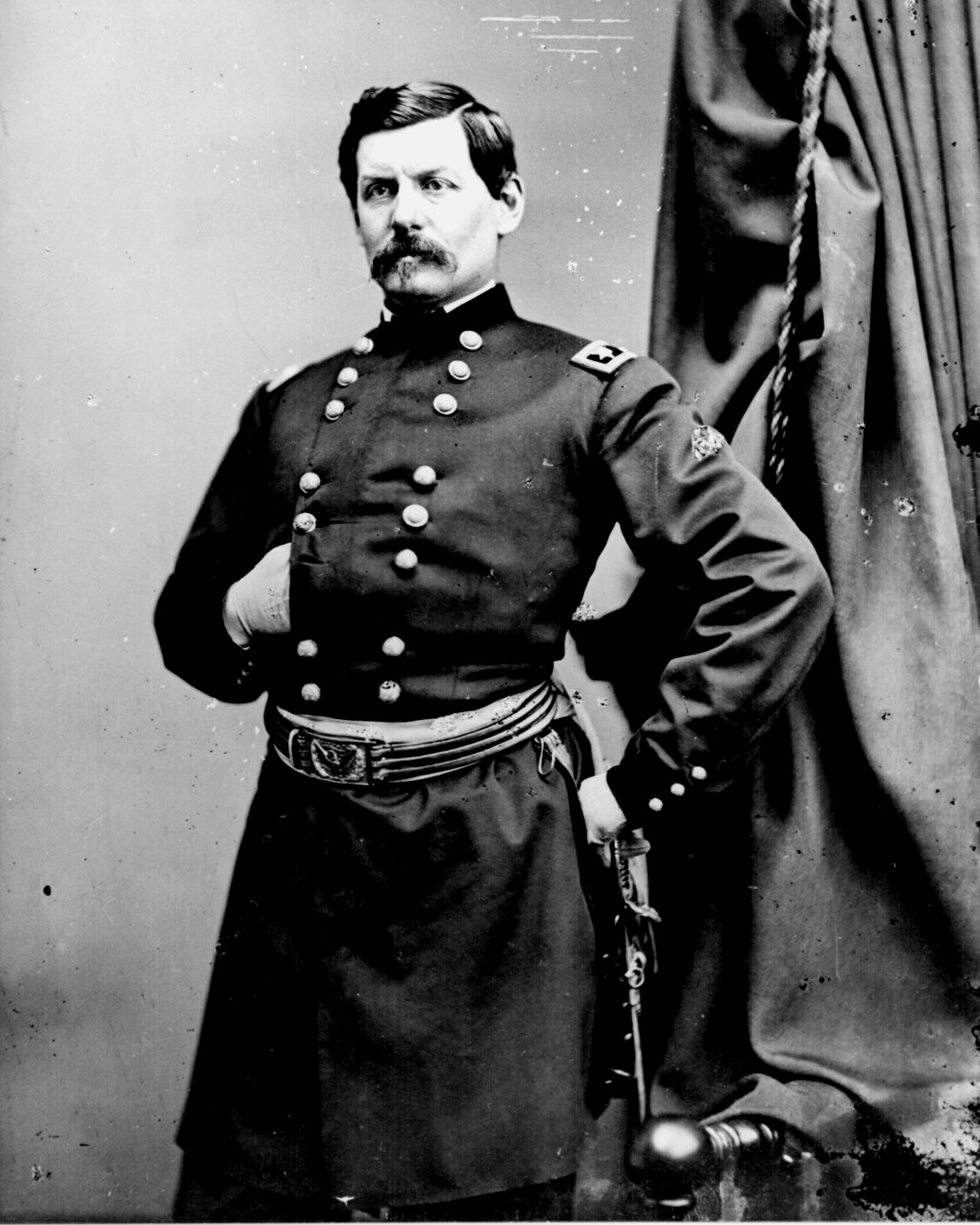
George B. McClellan

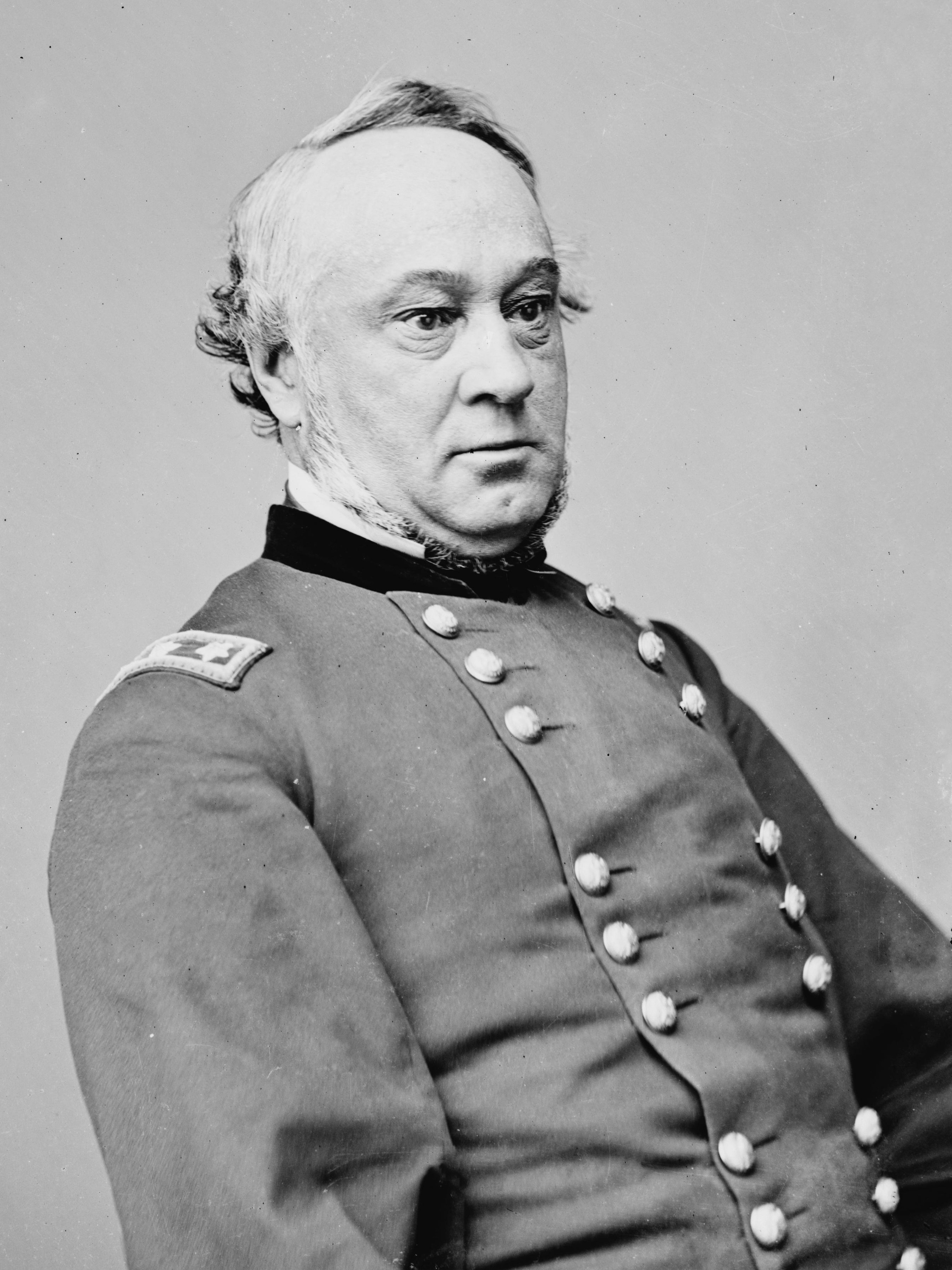
Henry W. Halleck

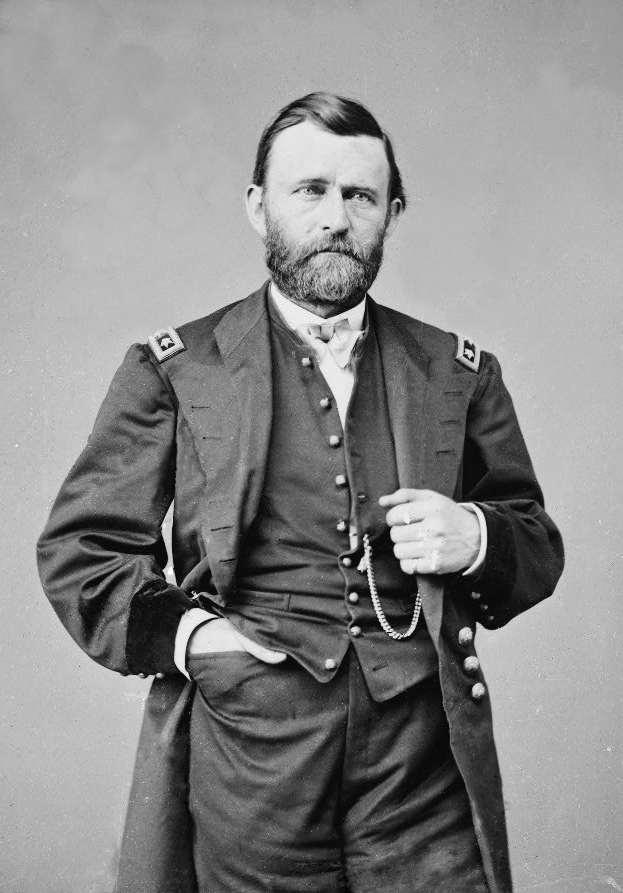
Ulysses S. Grant

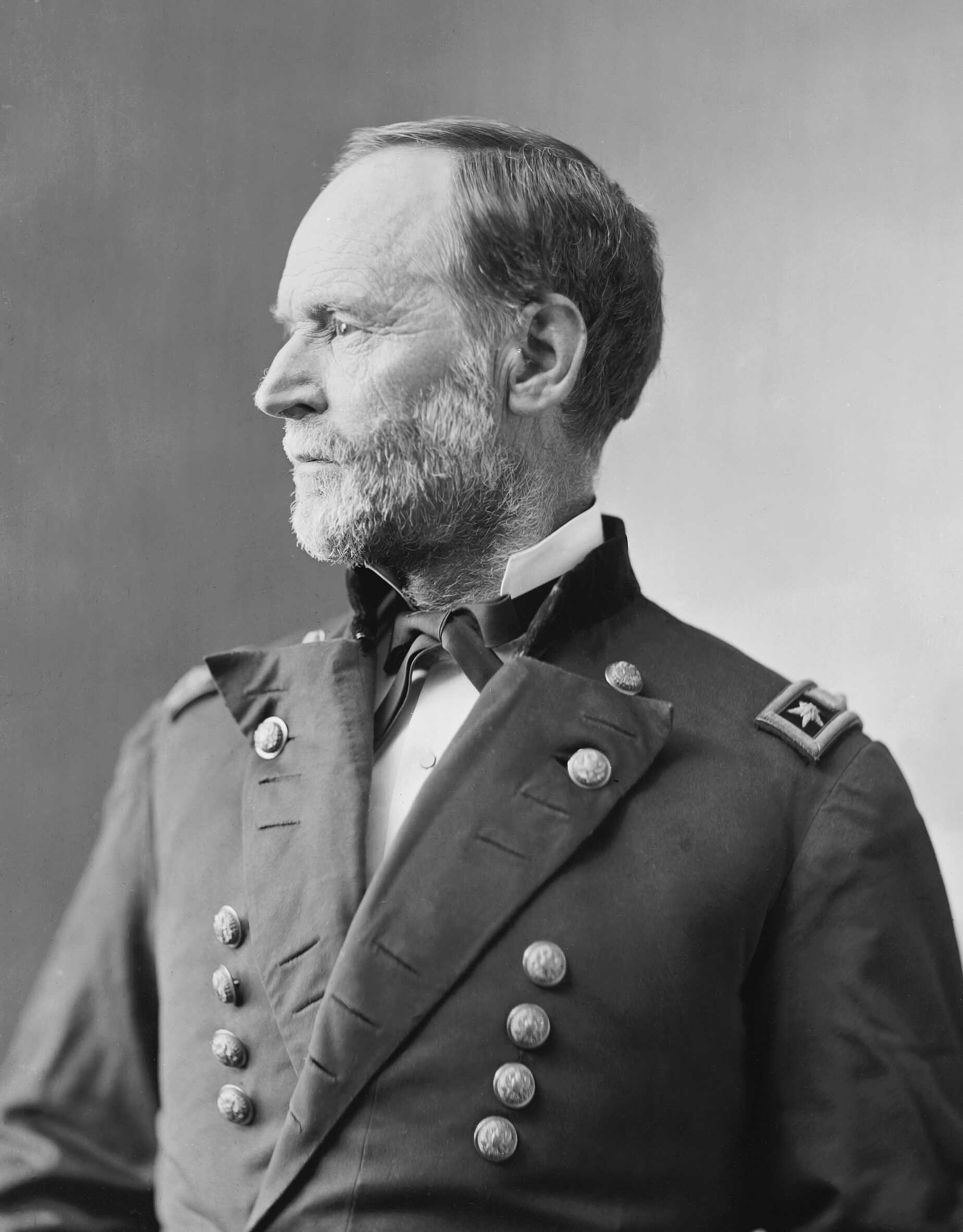
William T. Sherman

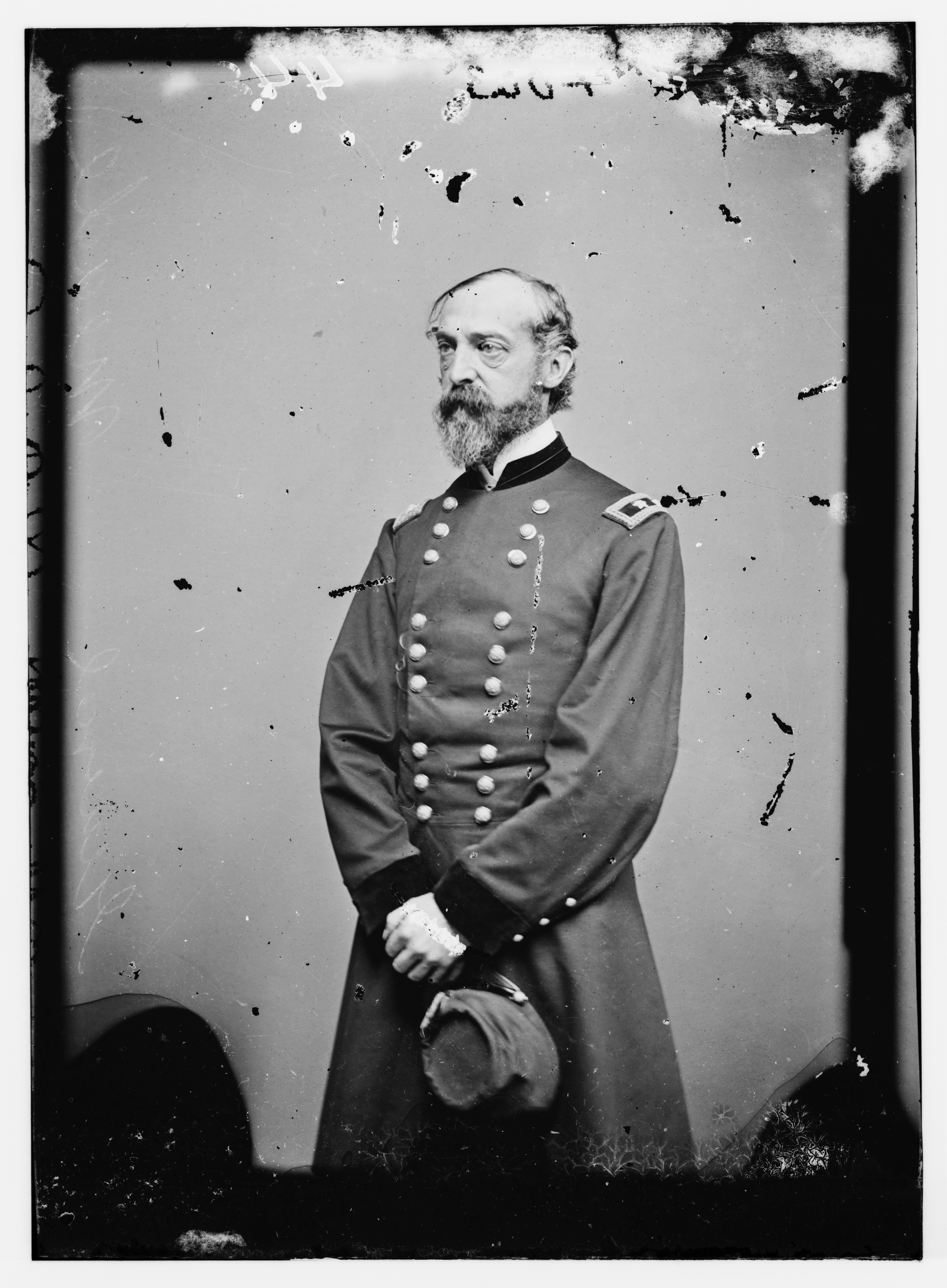
George G. Meade

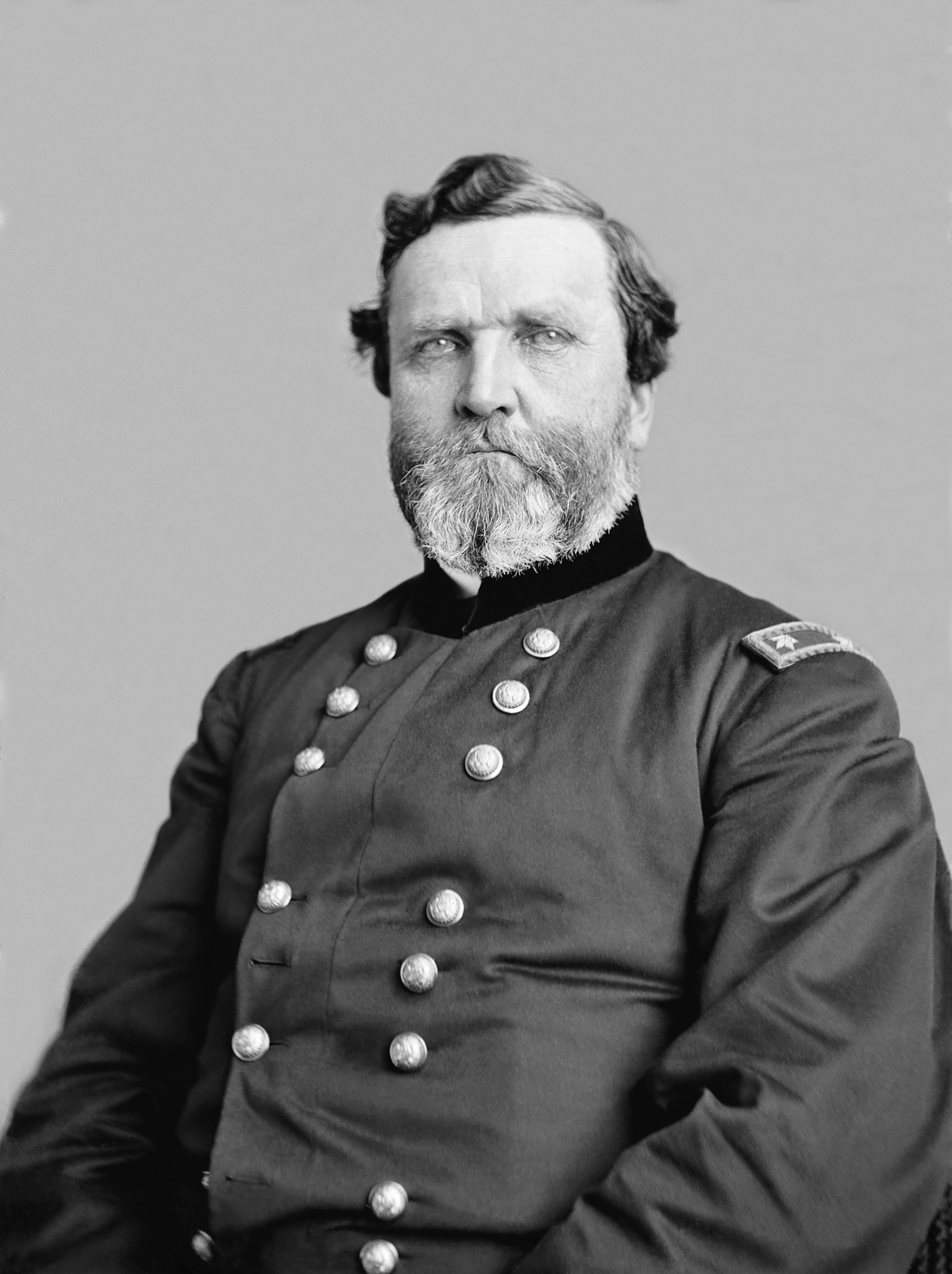
George H. Thomas

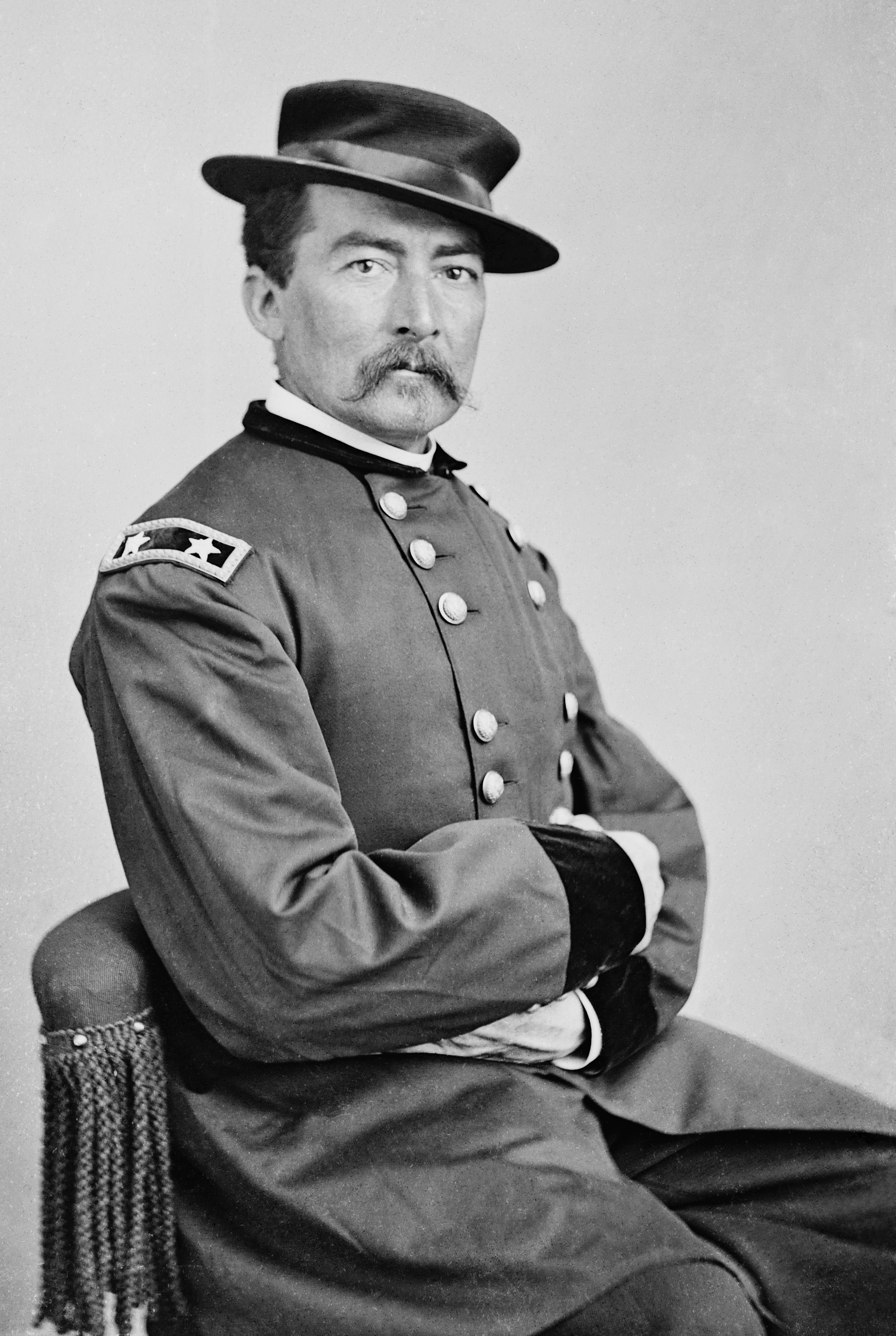
Philip H. Sheridan

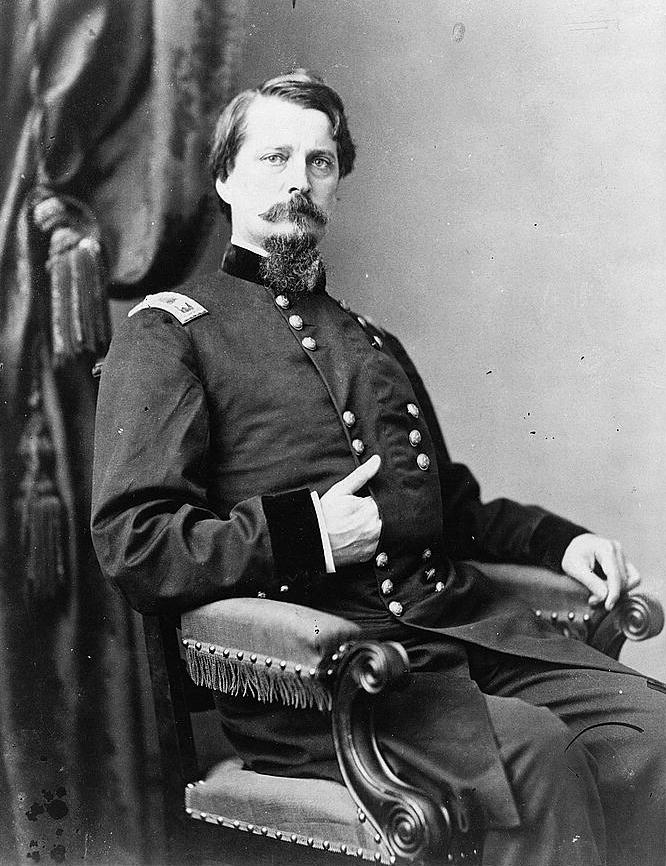
Winfield S. Hancock

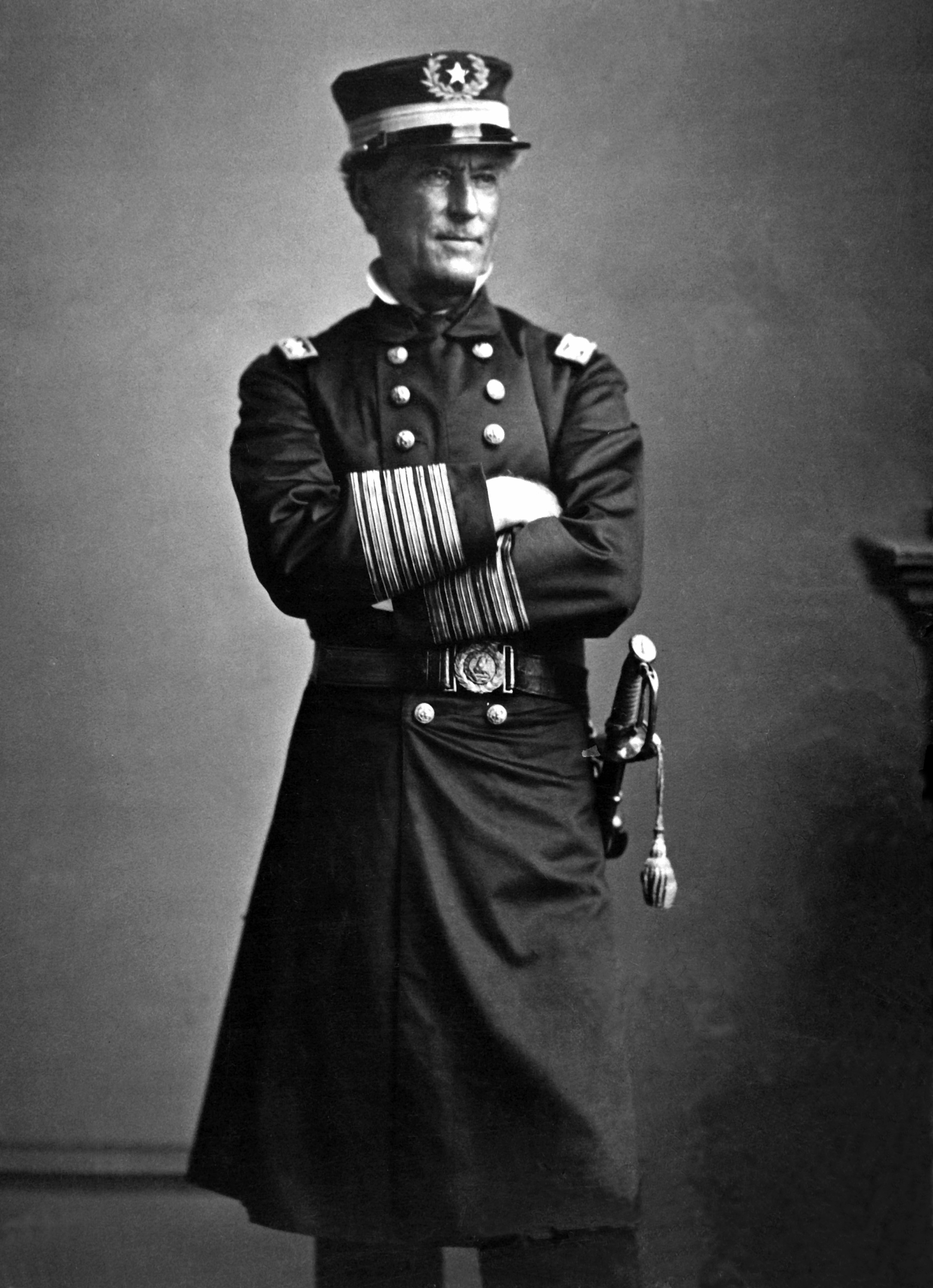
Admiral David Farragut

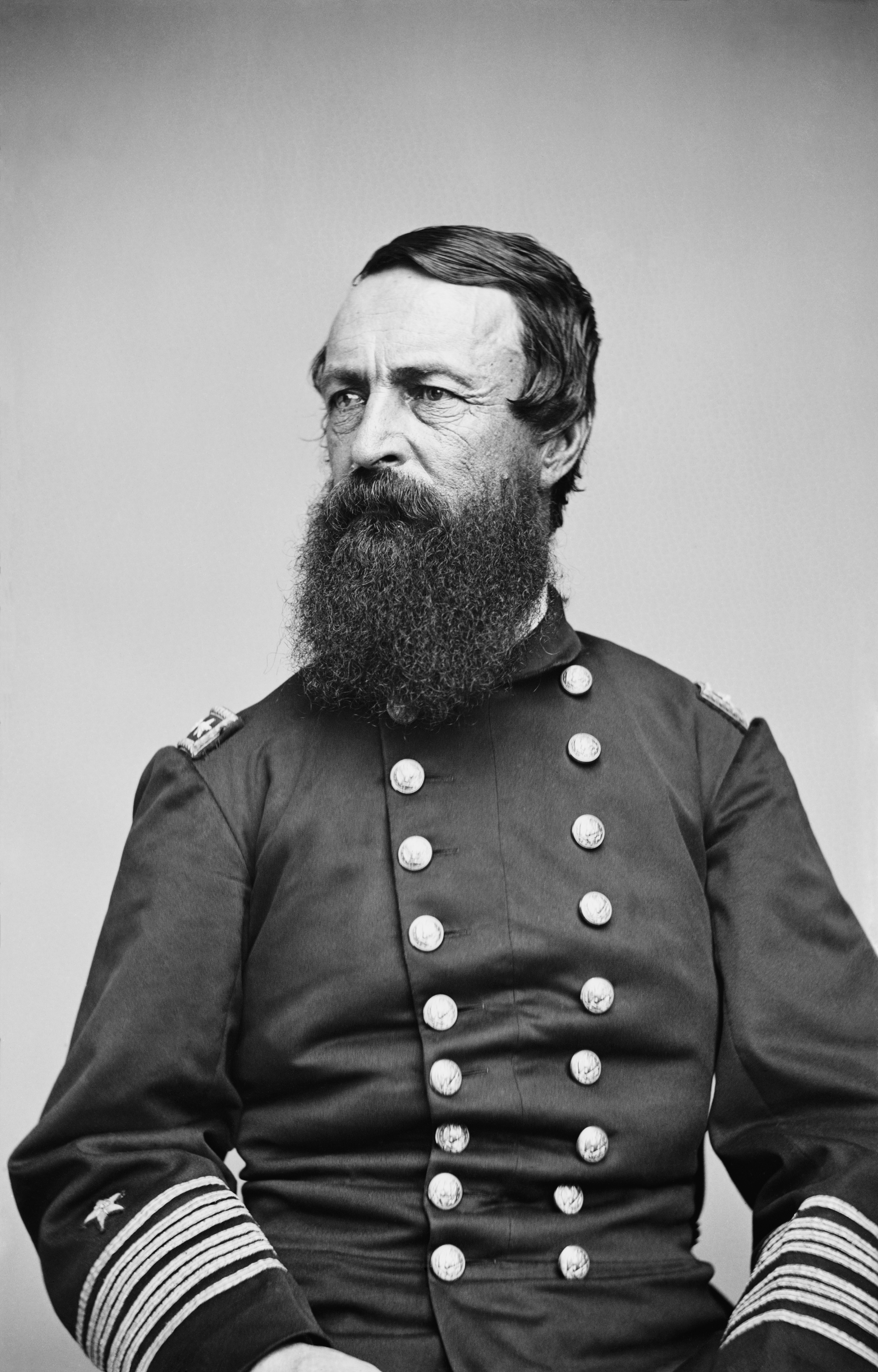
Admiral David Porter

=== Civilian military leaders ===
President Abraham Lincoln was Commander-in-Chief of the Union armed forces throughout the conflict; after his April 14, 1865 assassination, Vice President Andrew Johnson became the nation's chief executive. Lincoln's first Secretary of War was Simon Cameron; Edwin M. Stanton was confirmed to replace Cameron in January 13, 1862. Thomas A. Scott was Assistant Secretary of War. Gideon Welles was Secretary of the Navy, aided by Assistant Secretary of the Navy Gustavus Fox.

Title	Name	Tenure	Notes
Commander-in-Chief	Abraham Lincoln	March 4, 1861 – April 15, 1865 (1,464 days during the war)	assassinated April 14, 1865; died April 15, 1865
Commander-in-Chief	Andrew Johnson	April 15, 1865 – March 4, 1869 (24 days during the war)	Declared the armed conflict to be "virtually" ended on May 9, 1865
Secretary of War	Simon Cameron	March 5, 1861 – January 14, 1862 (277 days during the war)	resigned January 14, 1862
Secretary of War	Edwin Stanton	January 20, 1862 – May 28, 1867 (1,205 days during the war)	previously U.S. Attorney General
Secretary of Navy	Gideon Welles	March 7, 1861 – March 4, 1869 (1,488 days during the war)	

=== Regular Army officers ===
When the war began, the American standing army or "Regular army" consisted of only 1080 commissioned officers and 15,000 enlisted men. Although 142 regular officers became Union generals during the war, most remained "frozen" in their regular units. That stated, most of the major Union wartime commanders had previous regular army experience. Over the course of the war, the Commanding General of the United States Army was, in order of service, Winfield Scott, George B. McClellan, Henry Halleck, and finally, Ulysses S. Grant.

Commanding Generals, U.S.A.

No.	Name	Tenure	Notes
1	Brevet Lieutenant general Winfield Scott	July 5, 1841 – November 1, 1861	retired November 1, 1861
2	Major general George McClellan	November 1, 1861 – March 11, 1862	Commanded the Army of the Potomac in addition to serving as Commanding General. Relieved of duty as Commanding General on March 11, 1862.
3	vacant	March 11, 1862 – July 23, 1862	responsibilities of Commanding General fulfilled by President Lincoln
4	Major general Henry Halleck	July 23, 1862 – March 9, 1864	Appointed Chief of Staff of the General Headquarters in Washington DC on March 12, 1864
5	General Ulysses S. Grant	March 9, 1864 – March 4, 1869	first full rank General in the U.S. Army

- Robert Anderson
- Don Carlos Buell
- John Buford
- Ambrose Burnside
- Edward Canby
- Philip St. George Cooke
- Darius N. Couch
- Thomas Turpin Crittenden
- Thomas Leonidas Crittenden
- Samuel Curtis
- Abner Doubleday
- William B. Franklin
- James A. Garfield
- Quincy Adams Gillmore
- Gordon Granger
- David McMurtrie Gregg
- Henry Wager Halleck
- Winfield Scott Hancock
- William B. Hazen
- Samuel P. Heintzelman
- Joseph Hooker
- Oliver O. Howard
- Andrew A. Humphreys
- Henry Jackson Hunt
- David Hunter
- Philip Kearny
- Erasmus D. Keyes
- John McArthur
- George B. McClellan
- Alexander McDowell McCook
- Irvin McDowell
- James B. McPherson
- Joseph K. Mansfield
- George Meade
- Montgomery C. Meigs
- Wesley Merritt
- Dixon S. Miles
- Edward Ord
- Alfred Pleasonton
- John Pope
- John F. Reynolds
- William Rosecrans
- John Schofield
- Winfield Scott
- John Sedgwick
- Philip Sheridan
- William T. Sherman
- Henry W. Slocum
- Andrew Jackson Smith
- William Farrar Smith
- George Stoneman
- Edwin V. Sumner
- George Sykes
- George Henry Thomas
- Alfred Thomas Archimedes Torbert
- Gouverneur K. Warren
- James H. Wilson
- John E. Wool

=== Militia and political leaders appointed to Union military leadership ===
Under the United States Constitution, each state recruited, trained, equipped, and maintained local militia; regimental officers were appointed and promoted by state governors. After states answered Lincoln's April 15, 1861, ninety-day call for 75,000 volunteer soldiers, most Union states' regiments and batteries became known as United States Volunteers to distinguish between state-raised forces and regular army units. Union brigade-level officers (generals) could receive two different types of Federal commissions: U.S. Army or U.S. Volunteers (ex: Major General, U.S.A. as opposed to Major General, U.S.V.). While most Civil War generals held volunteer or brevet rank, many generals held both types of commission; regular rank was considered superior.

- Edward D. Baker
- Nathaniel Prentice Banks
- Francis Preston Blair Jr.
- Benjamin Franklin Butler
- Joshua Lawrence Chamberlain
- Jacob Dolson Cox
- John Adams Dix
- John C. Frémont
- Nathan Kimball
- John A. Logan
- John Alexander McClernand
- Daniel Sickles
- James B. Steedman
- Alfred Terry
- Lew Wallace

=== Native American and international officers in Union Army ===
Reflecting the multi-national makeup of the soldiers engaged, some Union military leaders derived from nations other than the United States.

- Philippe, Comte de Paris
- Michael Corcoran
- Włodzimierz Krzyżanowski
- Thomas Francis Meagher
- Ely Parker
- Albin F. Schoepf
- Carl Schurz
- Franz Sigel
- Régis de Trobriand
- Ivan Turchaninov
- August Willich

=== Union naval leaders ===
The rapid rise of the United States Navy during the Civil War contributed enormously to the North's ability to effectively blockade ports and Confederate shipping from quite early in the conflict. Handicapped by an aging 90 ship fleet, and despite significant manpower losses to the Confederate Navy after secession, a massive ship construction campaign embracing technological innovations from civil engineer James Buchanan Eads and naval engineers like Benjamin F. Isherwood and John Ericsson, along with four years' daily experience with modern naval conflict put the U. S. Navy onto a path which has led to today's world naval dominance.

Commanding Officer, U.S.N.

No.	Name	Tenure	Notes
-	Flag Officer Charles Stewart	March 2, 1859 – December 21, 1861	Served as "Senior Flag Officer, U.S.N." until his retirement on 21 December 1861; promoted Rear Admiral on the Retired list July 16, 1862
1	Vice Admiral David Farragut	December 21, 1861 – August 14, 1870	Commanded the West Gulf Blockading Squadron in addition to serving as Commanding Officer. Promoted full Admiral on July 25, 1866

- John A. Dahlgren
- Charles Henry Davis
- Samuel Francis du Pont
- David Farragut
- Andrew Hull Foote
- Samuel Phillips Lee
- David Dixon Porter
- John Ancrum Winslow
- John Lorimer Worden

== The Confederate States (The Confederacy) ==
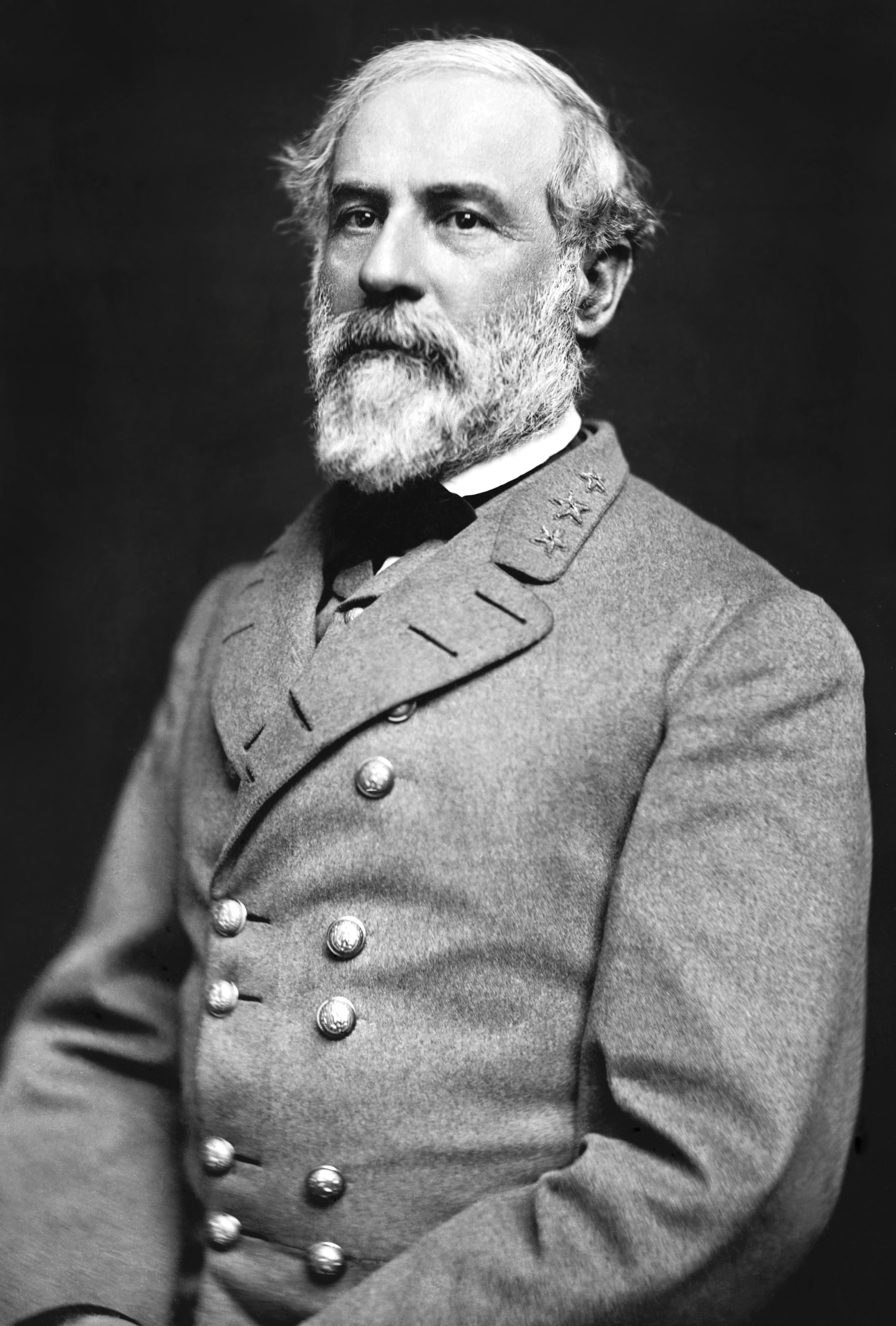
Robert E. Lee

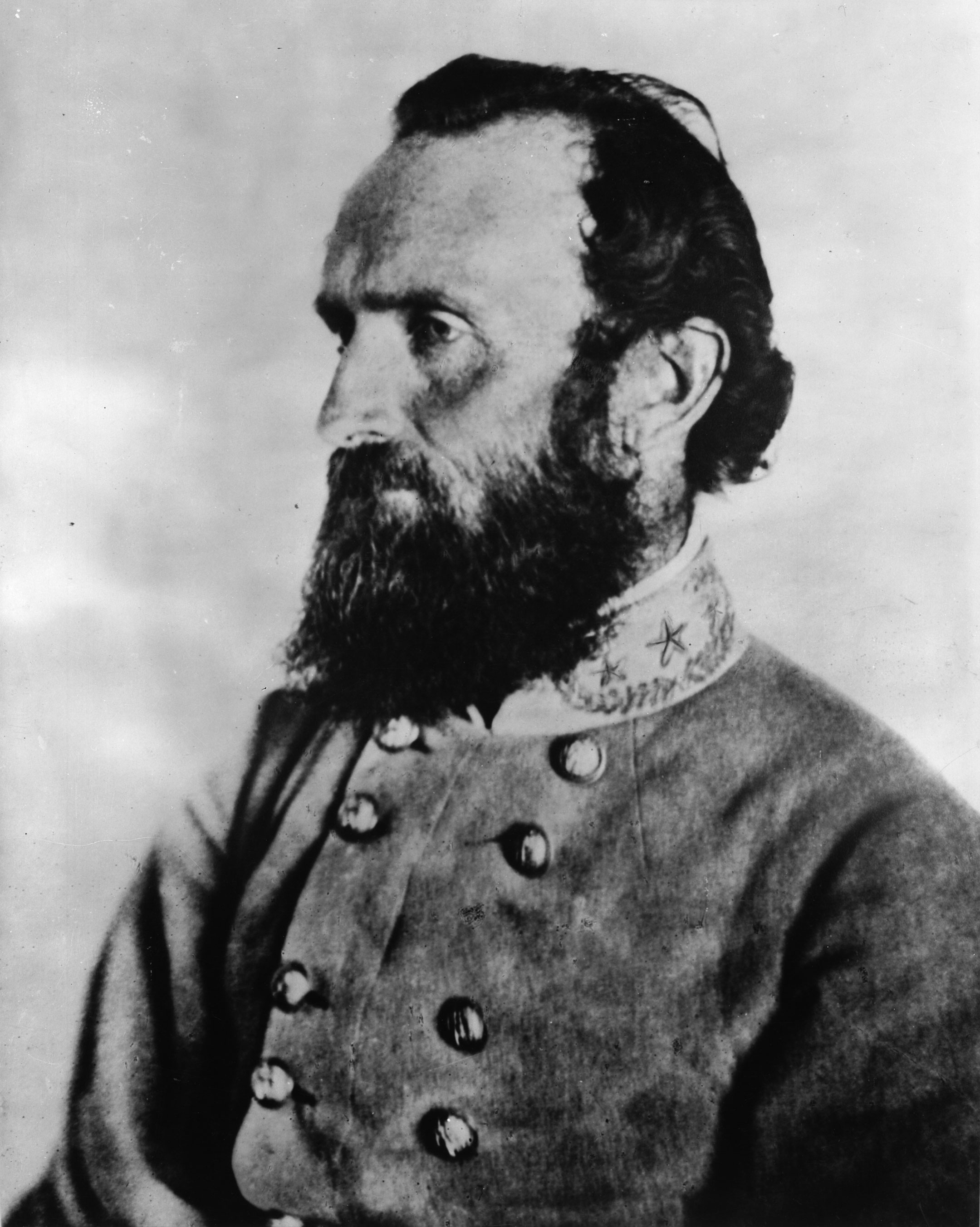
T.J. "Stonewall" Jackson

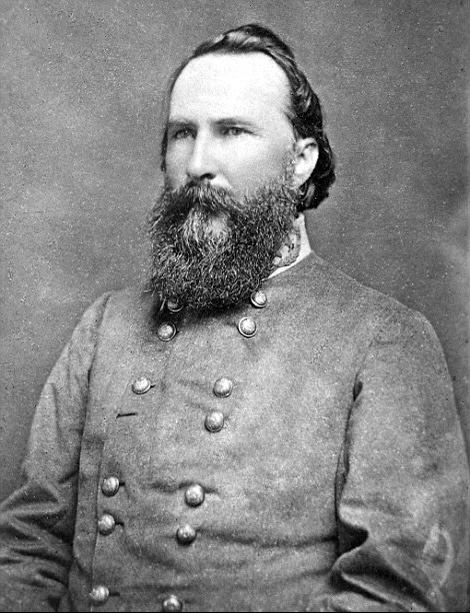
James Longstreet

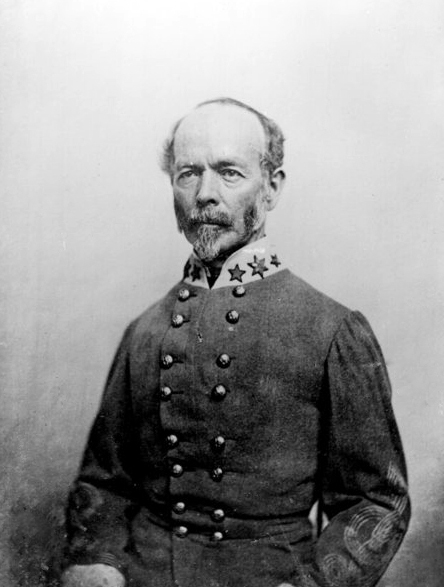
Joseph E. Johnston

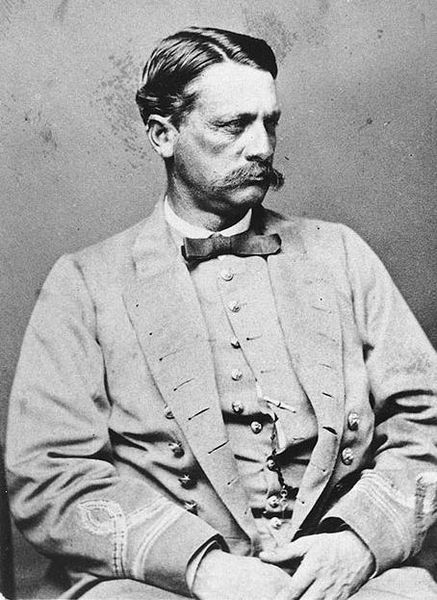
James Waddell

=== Civilian military leaders ===
Jefferson Davis was named provisional president on February 9, 1861, and assumed similar commander-in-chief responsibilities as would Lincoln; on November 6, 1861, Davis was elected President of the Confederate States of America under the Confederate Constitution. Alexander H. Stephens was appointed as Vice President of the Confederate States of America on February 18, 1861, and later assumed identical vice presidential responsibilities as Hannibal Hamlin did. Several men served the Confederacy as Secretary of War, including Leroy Pope Walker, Judah P. Benjamin, George W. Randolph, James Seddon, and John C. Breckinridge. Stephen Mallory was Confederate Secretary of the Navy throughout the conflict.

Title	Name	Tenure	Notes
Commander-in-Chief	Jefferson Davis	February 18, 1861 – May 5, 1865	
Vice President	Alexander H. Stephens	February 11, 1861 – May 11, 1865	
Secretary of War	LeRoy Pope Walker	February 25, 1861 – September 16, 1861	resigned September 16, 1861
Secretary of War	Judah P. Benjamin	September 17, 1861 – March 24, 1862	resigned March 24, 1862, to take appointment as CS Secretary of State
Secretary of War	George W. Randolph	March 24, 1862 – November 15, 1862	resigned November 15, 1862, for health reasons
Secretary of War	James Seddon	November 21, 1862 – February 5, 1865	resigned February 5, 1865
Secretary of War	Major General John C. Breckinridge	February 6, 1865 – May 10, 1865	
Secretary of Navy	Stephen Mallory	March 4, 1861 – May 2, 1865	

=== Former Regular Army officers ===
In the wake of secession, many regular officers felt they could not betray their loyalty to their home state, and as a result, some 313 of those officers resigned their commission and, in many cases, took up arms for the Confederate Army. Himself a graduate of West Point and a former regular officer, Confederate President Jefferson Davis highly prized these recruits to the cause and saw that former regular officers were given positions of authority and responsibility.

- Richard H. Anderson
- P.G.T. Beauregard
- Milledge Luke Bonham
- Braxton Bragg
- Simon Bolivar Buckner, Sr.
- George B. Crittenden
- Samuel Cooper
- Jubal Anderson Early
- Richard S. Ewell
- Franklin Gardner
- Robert S. Garnett
- Josiah Gorgas
- William Joseph Hardee
- Ambrose Powell Hill
- Daniel Harvey Hill
- John Bell Hood
- Thomas J. "Stonewall" Jackson
- Albert Sidney Johnston
- Joseph E. Johnston
- Robert E. Lee
- Stephen D. Lee
- Mansfield Lovell
- James Longstreet
- John B. Magruder
- Dabney Herndon Maury
- John Hunt Morgan
- John C. Pemberton
- George Pickett
- Edmund Kirby Smith
- Gustavus Woodson Smith
- J.E.B. Stuart
- Earl Van Dorn
- Joseph Wheeler

=== Militia and political leaders appointed to Confederate military leadership ===
The land of Davy Crockett and Andrew Jackson, the state military tradition was especially strong in southern states, some of which were until recently frontier areas. Several significant Confederate military leaders emerged from state unit commands.

- John C. Breckinridge
- Benjamin F. Cheatham
- Nathan Bedford Forrest
- Wade Hampton
- James L. Kemper
- Ben McCulloch
- Leonidas Polk
- Sterling Price
- Alexander P. Stewart
- Richard Taylor

=== Native American and international officers in Confederate army ===
While no foreign power sent troops or commanders directly to assist the Confederate States, some leaders derived from countries other than the United States.

- Patrick Cleburne
- Stand Watie
- Camille Armand Jules Marie, Prince de Polignac
- Raleigh E. Colston
- Collett Leventhorpe
- George St. Leger Grenfell
- Garnet Wolseley

=== Confederate naval leaders ===
The Confederate Navy possessed no extensive shipbuilding facilities; instead, it relied on refitting captured ships or purchased warships from Great Britain. The South had abundant navigable inland waterways, but after the Union built a vast fleet of gunboats, they soon dominated the Mississippi, Tennessee, Cumberland, Red and other rivers, rendering those waterways almost useless to the Confederacy. Confederates did seize several Union Navy vessels in harbor after secession and converted a few into ironclads, like the CSS Virginia. Blockade runners were built and operated by British naval interests, although by late in the war the C.S. Navy operated some. A few new vessels were built or purchased in Britain, notably the CSS Shenandoah and the CSS Alabama. These warships acted as raiders, wreaking havoc with commercial shipping. Aggrieved by these losses, in 1871 the U.S. government was awarded damages from Great Britain in the Alabama Claims.

- John Mercer Brooke
- Isaac Newton Brown
- Franklin Buchanan
- James Dunwoody Bulloch
- Catesby ap Roger Jones
- Matthew Fontaine Maury
- Raphael Semmes
- Josiah Tattnall III
- James Iredell Waddell

== See also ==
- History of Confederate States Army Generals
- Confederate States Armed Forces
- Union Army
- Union Navy
