= Thomas Crittenden =

Thomas Crittenden may refer to:

- Thomas Leonidas Crittenden (1819–1893), American Civil War general, lawyer, and politician
- Thomas Theodore Crittenden (1832–1909), Governor of Missouri
- Thomas Turpin Crittenden (1825–1905), American Civil War general
- Thomas T. Crittenden Jr. (1863–1938), mayor of Kansas City, Missouri
