= 2nd Kentucky Infantry Regiment =

2nd Kentucky Infantry Regiment may refer to:

- 2nd Kentucky Infantry Regiment (Confederate), a regiment in the Confederate States Army
- 2nd Kentucky Infantry Regiment (Union), a regiment in the Union Army

== See also ==
- 2nd Kentucky Cavalry Regiment, a regiment in the Union Army
