= Jeremiah C. Sullivan =

Union United States Army general (1830–1890)

Jeremiah Cutler Sullivan
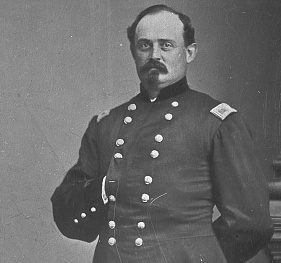
- Photograph of Brigadier General Jeremiah C. Sullivan
- Born: October 1, 1830; Madison, Indiana
- Died: October 21, 1890 (aged 60); Oakland, California
- Burial place: Mountain View Cemetery, Oakland, California
- Military career
- Allegiance: United States; Union
- Branch: United States Navy; United States Army
- Service years: 1848–1854 (Navy); 1861–1865 (Army)
- Rank: Midshipman; Brigadier General
- Unit: 6th Indiana Infantry Regiment
- Commands: 13th Indiana Infantry Regiment; 2nd Brigade, 3rd Division, Army of the Mississippi; District of Jackson, Tennessee; 2nd Division, Army of the Shenandoah
- Conflicts: Mexican–American War; American Civil War: Battle of Rich Mountain; First Battle of Kernstown; Battle of Iuka; Battle of Corinth; Battle of Parker's Cross Roads; Vicksburg campaign; Battle of New Market; Battle of Piedmont; Battle of Lynchburg

Jeremiah Cutler Sullivan (October 1, 1830 – October 21, 1890) was an Indiana lawyer, antebellum United States Navy officer, and a brigadier general in the Union Army during the American Civil War. He was among a handful of former Navy officers who later served as infantry generals during the war.

His family's home, The Judge Jeremiah Sullivan House, in Madison, Indiana stands as one of the oldest in the community.

== Early life and career ==
Jeremiah C. Sullivan was born in Madison, Indiana. He was the son of Virginia-born attorney Jeremiah Sullivan, who served as a justice of the Indiana Supreme Court and coined the name "Indianapolis" for the new state capital. He was the younger brother of Algernon Sydney Sullivan, New York attorney and founder of the Sullivan & Cromwell law firm.

Sullivan was appointed to the United States Naval Academy in Annapolis, Maryland, and graduated in 1848. He was commissioned as a midshipman and spent the next six years primarily at sea, serving aboard four different vessels, including duty during the Mexican–American War. In April 1854, he resigned from the Navy and returned home to Indiana, where he studied law, passed his bar exam, and opened a private practice.

== Civil War ==
Sullivan helped recruit and organize a three-months' infantry regiment, the 6th Indiana Volunteers. He was elected as a captain and led his troops into combat at the Battle of Philippi in western Virginia. Following the expiration of his term of enlistment, Sullivan mustered out of the army. However, he soon received an appointment from Governor Oliver P. Morton as the colonel of the 13th Indiana, a three-years' regiment. Sullivan returned to western Virginia in the army of George B. McClellan and fought at Rich Mountain and Cheat Mountain in the summer of 1861.

In the spring of 1862, Sullivan commanded a brigade of infantry during the Valley campaign and led it into action at the First Battle of Kernstown. He was commissioned as brigadier general to date from April 28, 1862. Later in the spring, he was transferred to the western theater and assigned command of a brigade in the Army of the Mississippi, serving under William S. Rosecrans. Sullivan again saw combat in the battles of Iuka and Corinth in Mississippi. In the autumn of that same year, Sullivan was given command of the District of Jackson, Tennessee, and its widely scattered garrisons of Union troops. There, his men were often pitted against the raiders of Confederate general Nathan B. Forrest, including the Battle of Parker's Crossroads, December 31, 1862..

Late December, Sullivan received General Grant's General Order #11, December 17, 1862, ordering the expulsion of all Jews in his military district. Sullivan refused to execute the order according to Rabbi Isaac Mayer. "He thought he was an officer of the army and not of a church." Four days later, Sullivan was forced to comply. Abraham Lincoln revoked Grant's General Order January 4, 1863.

During the 1863 Vicksburg campaign, Sullivan served on the field staff of Maj. Gen. Ulysses S. Grant as the acting inspector general for his army. Following the surrender of Vickburg on July 4, Sullivan took the position of Chief of Staff for Maj. Gen. James B. McPherson. In September, he was reassigned to the Department of West Virginia to serve under his father-in-law, Maj. Gen. Benjamin F. Kelley. Given command of a division, Sullivan was tasked with protecting the vital Baltimore and Ohio Railroad in Western Maryland. In mid-October 1863, he led a column from Harpers Ferry that thwarted an attack on Charlestown, West Virginia, by Confederates under John D. Imboden, driving the enemy up the valley.

During the Valley campaigns of 1864, Sullivan drew the ire of his superior, David Hunter, for his lack of initiative and was replaced by Brig. Gen. George Crook on July 16. Sullivan was never again given a significant command. He resigned from the army on May 11, 1865, and tellingly was not among the scores of Union generals who received brevet promotions to higher rank at the close of hostilities.

== Postbellum career ==
Sullivan moved to Oakland, Maryland, after the war, and then headed west to California in 1878. Despite his previous training and experience as an attorney, he instead worked at a variety of menial clerical jobs in both states.

Jeremiah C. Sullivan died in Oakland, California, in the fall of 1890 not long after his sixtieth birthday. He is buried in Mountain View Cemetery in Oakland.

== See also ==
- List of American Civil War generals (Union)
