= William E. Woodruff (soldier) =

American colonel and lawyer (1827–1914)

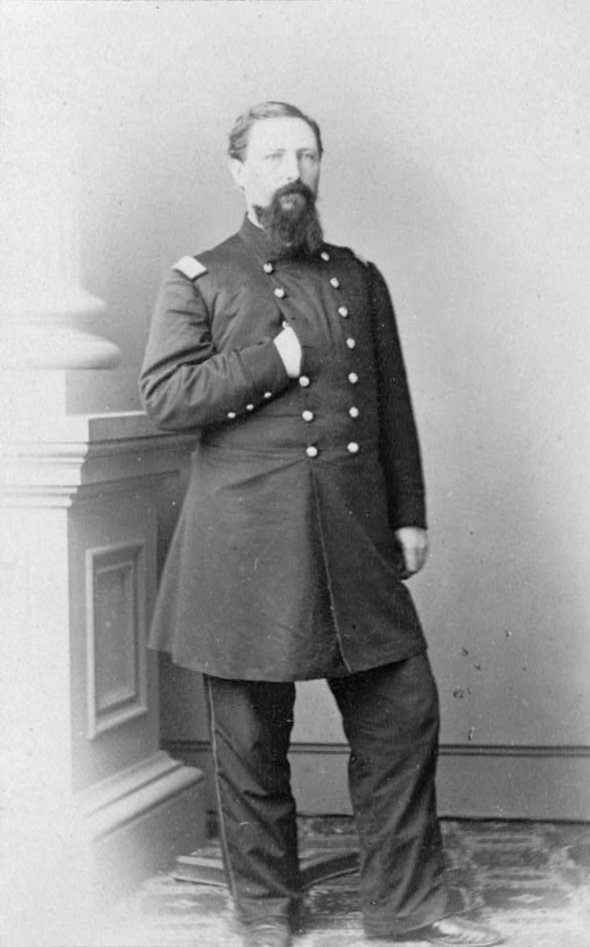
Woodruff in uniform, c. 1861

William Elihu Woodruff (June 14, 1827 – February 5, 1914) was an American soldier who served as colonel of the 25th Illinois Volunteer Infantry Regiment during the American Civil War. Woodruff was given temporary brigade and division command in the Army of the Cumberland, but not promoted to brigadier general. He resigned in January 1863 out of frustration for his lack of advancement and was replaced by Brig. Gen. Thomas T. Crittenden.

== Biography ==
Woodruff was born in Kentucky and educated in the common schools. He studied law, passed his bar exam, and established a successful practice in Louisville. He established strong ties with the local Republican Party.

Early in the war, Woodruff was colonel of the 2nd Kentucky Infantry. He was captured at the Battle of Scary Creek in western Virginia in 1861 and imprisoned for nine months in a Confederate prisoner-of-war camp. In April 1862 he was released in a prisoner exchange and placed in command of the 25th Illinois Infantry. He led a brigade in Jefferson C. Davis's division at the Battle of Stones River in late 1862. He fell from his horse and fractured his right ankle and badly damaged his right knee, incapacitating him for several months. During his recovery, he tendered his resignation in a letter dated January 19, 1863, to General Davis.

Woodruff was also very active in Freemasonry in Kentucky. In a Masonic career spanning fifty years, he "advanced through the chairs" in Clarke Lodge No. 51 in Louisville until his election as Master of that lodge in 1855. Also active in the Grand Lodge of Kentucky, he served on several Grand Lodge committees, and was appointed as a minor Grand Lodge officer in 1859 by the Grand Master of Kentucky, Rob Morris. In 1860, along with other Louisville Masons, he chartered a new lodge – Falls City Lodge No. 376 – and served as its first Senior Warden.
