= 6th Indiana Infantry Regiment =

- Active: April 22–August 2, 1861; September 20, 1861–September 22, 1864
- Disbanded: August 2, 1861; September 22, 1864
- Country: United States
- Allegiance: Union
- Branch: Infantry
- Size: Regiment
- Engagements: American Civil War: Battle of Philippi; Battle of Shiloh; Battle of Stones River; Battle of Chickamauga; Battle of Brown's Ferry; Battle of Missionary Ridge; Battle of Rocky Face Ridge; Battle of Resaca; [[Battle of Allatoona]] (Men were shot here in early May); Battle of Dallas

Commanders
- Colonel: Thomas Turpin Crittenden
- Colonel: Philemon P. Baldwin †
- Lt. Col: Hagerman Tripp
- Lt. Col: Calvin D. Campbell

The 6th Indiana Infantry Regiment was an infantry regiment from the State of Indiana that served in the Union Army during the American Civil War. This regiment was the senior Indiana regiment of the Civil War, as it was numbered first in sequence after the five Indiana volunteer regiments which had served in the Mexican–American War. The regiment was originally mustered-in for a three-month period of service between April and August 1861, but after its initial term of service had expired it was re-formed in September 1861 for a further three-year period, before being mustered out in September 1864.

== Service ==
The companies of the 6th Indiana Volunteer Infantry were raised in different parts of the state and organized at Indianapolis, Indiana between April 22 and April 27, 1861. The companies' counties of origin included Jefferson, Bartholomew, Daviess, Howard, Henry, Jennings, Jackson, and Hamilton. The Regiment was officially mustered into United States service for a period of three months on April 25, 1861.

Company	Earliest Moniker	Primary Location of Recruitment	Earliest Captain
A	Washington Guards	Madison	Thomas Turpin Crittenden
B	Columbus Volunteers	Columbus	Augustus H. Abbett
C	Washington Volunteers	Washington	Charles Childs
D	Kokomo Volunteers	Kokomo	Thomas J. Harrison
E	Sullivan's Company	Madison	Jeremiah C. Sullivan
F	Knightstown Quakers	Knightstown	William C. Moreau
G	Vernon Greys	Vernon	Hagerman Tripp
H	Jackson County Volunteers	Seymour	Fielder A. Jones
I	Hamilton Continentals	Noblesville	John D. Evans
K	Madison City Grays	Madison	Alois O. Bachman

On the May 30, 1861, the regiment left Indianapolis, by way of Cincinnati, Ohio, for Grafton, Virginia (now West Virginia). Sent on to the town of Webster, they arrived on June 2 and marched 14 miles (23 km) that same night to Philippi. On the morning of June 3, the 6th Indiana participated in the Battle of Philippi, one of the first land battles of the Civil War. They later participated in the Rich Mountain Campaign.

The regiment mustered out of service on August 2, 1861. Among its line officers was Captain Jeremiah C. Sullivan, who would later rise to the rank of brigadier general.

The 6th Indiana Volunteer Infantry was re-enlisted for three year service from the original regiment at Madison, Indiana, on September 20, 1861, by Colonel Thomas Turpin Crittenden. The regiment subsequently fought in the Battle of Shiloh, the Battle of Stones River, the Battle of Chickamauga, and the Battle of Resaca. At the conclusion of its three-year enlistment, the regiment was mustered out of service on September 22, 1864. Soldiers of the regiment who had unexpired enlistments, and those who re-enlisted were transferred to 68th Indiana Infantry Regiment.

== Total strength and casualties ==
The total strength of the 6th Indiana Infantry at the time of its organization in April 1861 was 782 men, including 37 commissioned officers. During its first three-month period of service, the regiment suffered no casualties in battle, but three enlisted men died of disease and one member of the regiment was captured by the enemy and later exchanged. After being mustered in as a three-year regiment, the unit lost a further nine officers and 116 enlisted men killed in battle or died of wounds, and a further two officers and 140 enlisted men who died of disease, for a total of 267 fatalities.

== Commanders ==
- Colonel Thomas Turpin Crittenden
- Colonel Philemon P. Baldwin – killed in action at the Battle of Chickamauga
- Colonel Hagerman Tripp

== See also ==
- List of Indiana Civil War regiments
- Indiana in the Civil War

== Notes/References/Sources ==
Notes

Sources

- Briant, Charles C. (1891). History of the Sixth Regiment Indiana Volunteer Infantry. : Of Both the Three months' and Three Years' Services ... Indianapolis, IN: W.B. Burford, printer and binder. OCLC 1609598.
- Dyer, Frederick Henry (1908). A Compendium of the War of the Rebellion (PDF). Des Moines, IA: Dyer Pub. Co. p. 1119. ASIN B01BUFJ76Q. This article incorporates text from this source, which is in the public domain.
- Federal Publishing Company (1908). Military Affairs and Regimental Histories of New Jersey, Indiana, Illinois and Michigan (PDF). The Union Army: A History of Military Affairs in the Loyal States, 1861–65 – Records of the Regiments in the Union army – Cyclopedia of battles – Memoirs of Commanders and Soldiers. Vol. III. Madison, WI: Federal Publishing Company. pp. 110–111. OCLC 694018100. This article incorporates text from this source, which is in the public domain.
- Holloway, William R. (2004). Civil War Regiments from Indiana, 1861-1865. Pensacola, FL: eBooksOnDisk.com. ISBN 978-1-932157-31-4. OCLC 56577553.
- Terrell, William Henry Harrison (1865). Report of the Adjutant General of the State of Indiana (pdf). Indiana Adjutant General Reports. Vol. II. Indianapolis, IN: A.H. Connor State Printer. pp. 32–39. OCLC 558004259. This article incorporates text from this source, which is in the public domain.
- "Indiana Battle Flag Inventory". Indiana War Memorial. May 4, 2021.
