= Ann Crittenden Coleman =

American author (1813–1891)

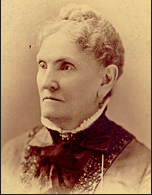
- Born: Ann Mary Butler Crittenden; May 5, 1813; Russellville, Kentucky or Frankfort, Kentucky, U.S. (sources vary)
- Died: February 13, 1891 (aged 77); Louisville, Kentucky, U.S.
- Occupations: author; translator
- Spouse: Chapman Coleman (m. 1830; died 1850)
- Children: 7 (including Florence, Eugenia, and Cornelia)
- Relatives: John J. Crittenden (father); George B. Crittenden & Thomas Leonidas Crittenden (brothers); John Crittenden Sr. (grandfather); John C. Watson (nephew); Thomas Jefferson (direct ancestor)
- Writing career
- Pen name: Mrs. Chapman Coleman
- Language: English

Ann Crittenden Coleman (née, Crittenden; pen name, Mrs. Chapman Coleman; May 5, 1813 – February 13, 1891) was a 19th-century American author and translator. Her parents were John J. Crittenden, the statesman, and Sarah O. (Lee) Crittenden, of the Lee family. After Coleman was widowed, she removed to Europe with her younger children, affording them a good education. She in turn learned French and German, and upon her return to the United States, published various translations. After her father's death, Coleman penned his biography. She met Lafayette as a child, and was personally acquainted during her life with many of the U.S. presidents. Alexander H. Stephens and Gen. Ulysses S. Grant were close friends.

== Early life and education ==
Ann Mary Butler Crittenden was born in Russellville, Kentucky on May 5, 1813. (Note: According to Raymond (1870), Ann Mary Butler Crittenden was born at Frankfort, Kentucky.) She was the daughter of John J. and Sarah ("Sallie") O. (Lee) Crittenden, his first wife. Both of Coleman's grandfathers, John Crittenden Sr. and John Lee, were distinguished American Revolutionary War soldiers. Through her father, Coleman was a direct descendant of Thomas Jefferson. Coleman's siblings included brothers, Confederate major general George, Union general Thomas, and Robert, as well as sister, Cornelia and Sarah ("Sallie"), who was the mother of John C. Watson, a Rear Admiral in the U.S. Navy. Her father remarried twice after Sarah Lee's death, and as a result, there were two half-siblings, John and Eugene.

She was educated by her father, under his personal attention. Her educational advantages in early life were not such as were later available for young women, but they were the best that Kentucky at that time afforded. At her father's house, she met with the most distinguished men of the State, and grew up among the thinkers and talkers of the day.

== Career ==
In 1830, at the age of seventeen, she married Chapman Coleman, U.S. marshal for Kentucky under President John Quincy Adams. They resided in Louisville, Kentucky until she was widowed in 1850.

Upon the death of her husband and the subsequent marriage of her eldest daughter, she took her younger children to Europe, where she devoted herself to travel and the study of European literature and the languages. Mrs. Coleman was the mother of seven children, and from their birth she devoted herself to their education. Coleman spent much time in Paris, and had the entrée to the court circle, though they lived in Germany for the purpose of the children's education. Coleman studied with the children, and mastered the French and German languages.

On her return from Europe, Coleman resided principally in Baltimore, Maryland, where she turned her attention to literary matters, and became an energetic literary worker. Daughters Eugenia, Judith, and Sallie assisted their mother in translations, including some of Luise Mühlbach's works, relating to Frederick the Great. Coleman also translated various French works for American publishers. She was also one of the select committee sent from Baltimore to petition President Andrew Johnson on behalf of Jefferson Davis, then in prison.

In 1864, after the death of her father, she published The Life of John J. Crittenden, with selections from his correspondence and speeches. [With a portrait.], which had a wide circulation, and was accepted as the authorized life of the statesman.

She died at Louisville, Kentucky on February 13, 1891, aged 77, leaving numerous descendants, among them sixteen grandchildren and five great-grandchildren.

== Publications ==
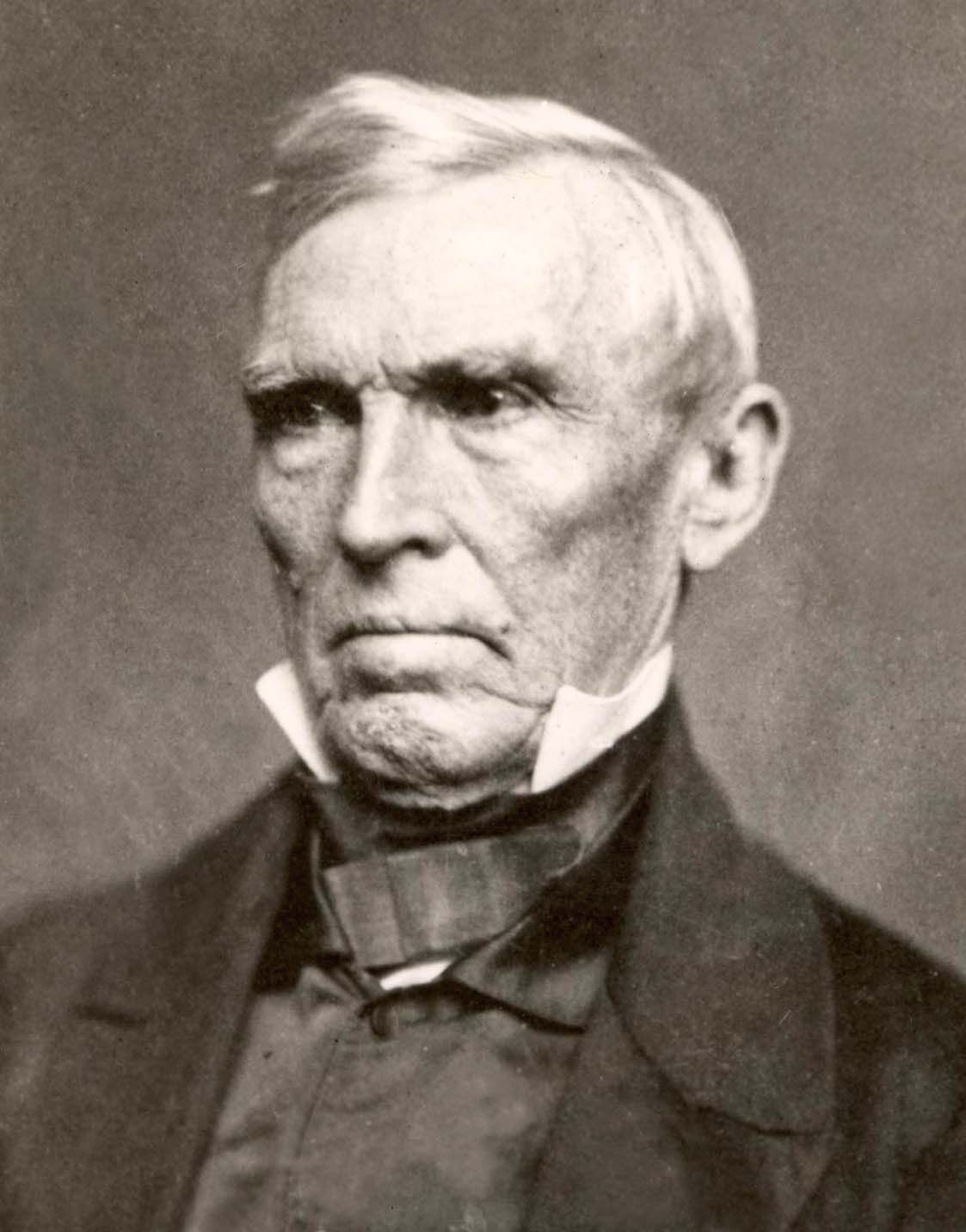
Coleman's father, John Jordan Crittenden

- The Life of John J. Crittenden, with selections from his correspondence and speeches. [With a portrait.], 1864
