= Thomas L. Connelly =

American historian (1938–1991)

Thomas Lawrence Connelly (February 14, 1938 – January 18, 1991) was an American historian and author who specialized in the Civil War era. He is perhaps best known for his book, The Marble Man: Robert E. Lee and His Image in American Society, one of the most scholarly and critical books on Robert E. Lee.

== Early life and education ==
Connelly was born February 14, 1938, in Nashville, Tennessee, to Fred Marlin (1909–1983) and Mildred Inez Connelly (1911–1983). As a boy, he visited the Nashville Civil War battlefield. Growing up in the Nashville area gave him a love of country music and spurred his desire to write more about the war in Tennessee. Connelly became one of the most prominent scholars of the war in the western theater in a scholarly field dominated by books about Virginia and its military leaders. Part of his mission to highlight the war in the West was personal. He was frustrated by the fact that his own family's Civil War history was shrouded in rumor and legend. "Scores of personal experiences," he wrote later, "a handful of tales related by an old man, and a shoe box of bullet fragments—such is one family's heritage in the Army of Tennessee."

Connelly attended Rice University, where he obtained his master's degree and Ph.D. He graduated in 1963. His dissertation, done under the supervision of Frank E. Vandiver, was "Metal, Fire and Forge: The Army of Tennessee, 1861-1862." The same year, he published his first book, Will Success Spoil Jeff Davis? The Last Book about The Civil War, a play on the 1957 film title, Will Success Spoil Rock Hunter?. Complete with illustrations by Campbell Grant, the book offered a humorous take on Civil War culture and Confederate heritage groups. According to Emory Thomas, publication of the book around the time of the JFK assassination was unfortunate: the book's ironic tone found a small audience in a country grieving over a fallen president. The book is now a collector's item.

== Career ==
In 1967, Connelly published Army of the Heartland: The Army of Tennessee, 1861-1862, through Louisiana State University Press. Connelly taught at Presbyterian College and Mississippi State University before landing at the University of South Carolina, Columbia in 1969. While teaching in Columbia, he published several books, including The Marble Man, Autumn of Glory, which was the second in his two-volume history of the Army of Tennessee, and a book on activist and preacher Will Campbell. Emory Thomas has called his books on the Army of Tennessee “definitive” and his book on Campbell “one of the best books on the American South ever written.”

In 1986, Connelly was named the Caroline McKissick Dial Professor of History. In addition to his teaching duties, he wrote weekly columns for a Columbia newspaper. Despite being “painfully shy,” He was close to fellow Lee scholar Emory Thomas, who remembered him as a “wild, wild man.” He also was friends with country musicians Tom T. Hall and Bob McDill and wrote country songs himself.

== Death and legacy ==
Connelly died on January 18, 1991, in Columbia, South Carolina, of cancer. His obituary appeared the next day, January 19. The 19th was, ironically, the anniversary of Robert E. Lee's birth. Friend and historian Emory M. Thomas eulogized Connelly as “brilliant,” a man who “loved the South,” and was someone who “came closer to the truth about Lee than anyone else ever has.” The director of Louisiana State University Press called him a “brilliantly iconoclastic scholar whose work has had, and, will continue to have, a major influence on the study of the history of the South.”

He is survived by his son Patrick and his daughters Heather and Alison.

== Works ==
=== Books ===
- Will Success Spoil Jefferson Davis? The Last Book about the Civil War. New York: McGraw-Hill, 1963.
- Army of the Heartland: The Army of Tennessee, 1861-1862. Baton Rouge: Louisiana State University Press, 1967.
- Autumn of Glory: The Army of Tennessee, 1862-1865. Baton Rouge: Louisiana State University Press, 1971.
- The Marble Man: Robert E. Lee and His Image in American Society. Baton Rouge: Louisiana State University Press, 1977.
- Will Campbell and the Soul of the Soul. New York: Continuum, 1982.
- with Barbara Bellows: God and General Longstreet: The Lost Cause and the Southern Mind. Baton Rouge: Louisiana State University Press, 1995.
