= George B. Crittenden =

U.S. Army and Confederate Army officer

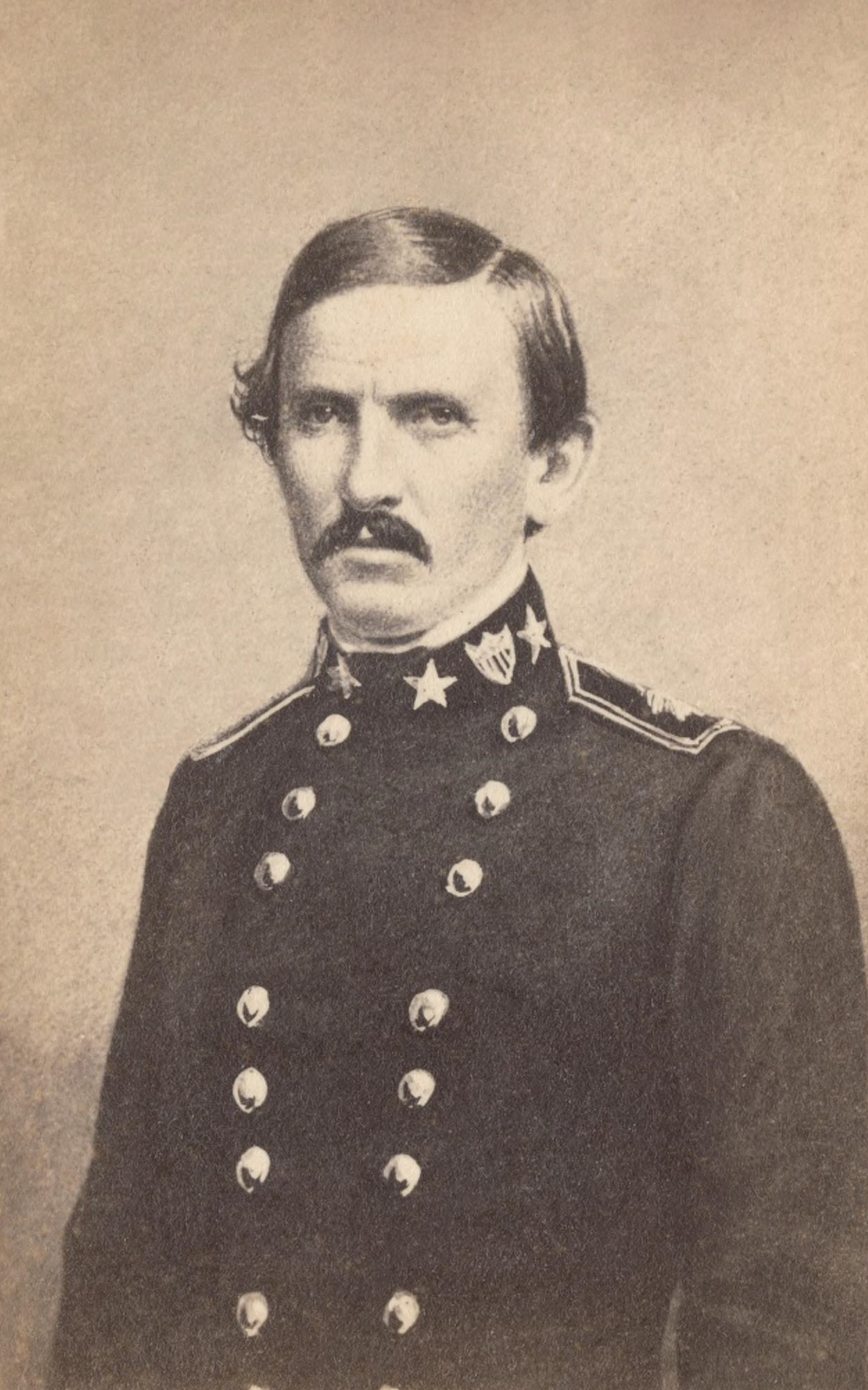
- Born: March 20, 1812; Russellville, Kentucky, U.S.
- Died: November 27, 1880 (aged 68); Danville, Kentucky, U.S.
- Burial place: Frankfort Cemetery
- Military career
- Allegiance: United States; Republic of Texas; Confederate States of America
- Branch: United States Army; Army of the Republic of Texas; Confederate States Army
- Service years: 1832–1833; 1846–1861 (USA); 1842–1843 (Texas); 1861–1865 (CSA)
- Rank: Lieutenant colonel (USA); 2nd Lieutenant (Texas); Major general (CSA)
- Commands: 2nd Division of the Army of Central Kentucky
- Conflicts: Black Hawk War; Mier expedition; Mexican–American War; Battle of Contreras; Battle of Churubusco; American Civil War; Battle of Mill Springs; Wytheville Raid; Battle of Bull's Gap; Battle of Marion
- Other work: State Librarian of Kentucky

George Bibb Crittenden (March 20, 1812 – November 27, 1880) was a soldier in both the United States Army and the Confederate States Army during the mid-19th century. The son of influential Kentucky politician John J. Crittenden, George Crittenden enrolled in the United States Military Academy in 1828, graduating four years later. He served in the Black Hawk War in 1832 before resigning from the military in 1833. Crittenden spent the rest of the decade practicing law and became an alcoholic. Leaving Kentucky, he traveled to the then-independent Republic of Texas and joined the Army of the Republic of Texas. He took part in the Mier expedition, an unauthorized Texian military incursion into Mexico that was forced to surrender. John Crittenden used his influence to push for his son's release, and George returned to Kentucky. In 1846, he rejoined the military for service in the Mexican–American War, but was arrested for drunkenness before he could see combat. Having been restored to the service, he received a brevet promotion for his actions at the Battle of Contreras and the Battle of Churubusco in 1847. Crittenden was arrested twice for drunkenness in 1848, but his father's influence allowed him to continue his military career.

Crittenden continued in the United States military until the outbreak of the American Civil War in 1861, rising to the rank of lieutenant colonel. He resigned from the military in June, and by November was a major general in the Confederate States Army. Initially assigned to command east Tennessee and as much of Kentucky as he could hold, his command was later reduced to the brigades of Brigadier Generals Felix Zollicoffer and William Carroll. In December, Zollicoffer made a tactically questionable decision to move his troops north of the Cumberland River; by the time Crittenden arrived on the scene from his Knoxville, Tennessee, headquarters, it was too late to correct this deployment. On January 19, 1862, Crittenden ordered an attack while his Union opponents were divided by a flooded creek. The resulting Battle of Mill Springs was a Confederate defeat, and Zollicoffer was killed.

Retreating back into Tennessee, Crittenden faced allegations of drunkenness during the battle and of disloyalty. Assigned to command a corps under General Albert Sidney Johnston, Crittenden was arrested on April 1 for being drunk on duty. After a series of legal proceedings, Crittenden resigned in October. Re-entering the Confederate service as a colonel in April 1863, he served in staff roles in the backwater Department of Western Virginia, and for a time in 1864 held departmental command of the Department of Western Virginia and East Tennessee. After the war ended in 1865, Crittenden returned to Kentucky. He was indicted for treason upon his return, but pardoned in 1867. From 1867 to 1874, he was the state librarian of Kentucky. Crittenden died in 1880. His brother Thomas L. Crittenden was a Union major general during the war.

== Early life, education, and move to Texas ==
Crittenden was born in Russellville, Kentucky, on March 20, 1812. He was brother to Thomas L. Crittenden, and he was the firstborn son of John J. Crittenden and Sarah Lee, who was an influential politician: governor of Kentucky in the late 1840s and early 1850s, United States Attorney General in the administrations of Presidents William Henry Harrison and Taylor, and a United States Senator. Two of George's uncles served in the Kentucky Legislature, and another uncle, Robert Crittenden, gained prominence in the Arkansas Territory as an attorney. His younger sister Ann became a writer and translator. George spent his youth in Frankfort, Kentucky. His mother had died in 1824 and he was sent to a boarding school in Lexington, Kentucky, the same year. The American National Biography describes him as "an apt pupil". His appointment secured by his father, Crittenden was admitted to the United States Military Academy in 1828. He graduated four years later, the 26th-ranked out of 45 cadets. Crittenden was assigned to the 4th Infantry Regiment with a brevet rank of second lieutenant. The regiment was initially slated for garrison duty, but saw active service when the Black Hawk War broke out later that year. (Note: The Black Hawk War was fought in early to mid 1832 when Native Americans under tribal leader Black Hawk led a group of followers back to their ancestral territory on the east side of the Mississippi River, from which they had been removed through the United States government's Indian removal policy. The war was effectively ended when Black Hawk was defeated at the Battle of Bad Axe in 1832.) The Black Hawk War ended later in 1832, and the 4th Infantry returned to building military infrastructure in the Southern United States, including being stationed for a time in the Arkansas Territory, and in Georgia and Alabama. On April 30, 1833, he resigned from the military and enrolled in Transylvania University, to study law, having studied law under his father before enrolling in the university. After receiving a Bachelor of Laws, he started a law practice later in 1833. He commanded a Kentucky militia company in 1836. By the end of the decade, Crittenden had developed a serious drinking problem.

Crittenden later moved to the then-independent Republic of Texas, without informing his father. Joining the Army of the Republic of Texas, Crittenden participated as a second lieutenant in the 1842 Mier expedition, an incursion by Texian troops into Mexico that was made without orders. The Texians were forced to surrender after being defeated in battle at Mier in December. By January 1843, Crittenden had become too ill to travel and entered a Mexican hospital. In March, the Texian prisoners were informed that one out of every ten of them would be executed, after an escape attempt had been made. The prisoners drew from a jar of beans; those who drew black beans were executed. A story later spread that Crittenden had originally drawn a white bean, had given it to another Texian who had a family back home, and had then drawn a white bean again on the second try. Biographer James M. Prichard considers this to be doubtful, as the tale is not found in survivor accounts of the incident and as the prisoners were blindfolded while drawing the beans, along with the fact that Crittenden had previously been transferred to a hospital. Crittenden's father used his influence to press for his son's release, and former United States President Andrew Jackson provided critical assistance, by writing a letter to Santa Anna, the Mexican president. On March 15, Santa Anna announced his intention to free Crittenden. Released in April, Crittenden was returned to New Orleans, Louisiana, via Vera Cruz and Havana, arriving back in the United States on May 7.

== United States military service ==
Locations relevant to Crittenden's military career

Crittenden made his way back to Kentucky; Prichard speculates that he resumed his legal career. When the Mexican–American War began in 1846, Crittenden rejoined the United States Army. He was appointed a captain on May 27, and served under Major William W. Loring in the Regiment of Mounted Riflemen. Crittenden was arrested for drunkenness, and tendered his resignation, after which he traveled to Washington, D.C. to plead with the United States Secretary of War. Having been restored to duty, Crittenden fought in Winfield Scott's army in 1847, during its campaign to capture Mexico City. For "gallant and meritorious conduct" at the Battle of Contreras and the Battle of Churubusco, (Note: Churubusco and Contreras were two related actions. Fighting at Contreras began on August 19 and continued into August 20, while Churubusco was fought on August 20.) Crittenden was awarded a brevet promotion to major on August 20. In early 1848, he was arrested for drunkenness again, but his father was influential enough that Crittenden was able to continue his military career. A full promotion followed on March 15, but this was succeeded by another arrest for drunkenness. After a court martial, Crittenden was cashiered from the military on August 19.

Crittenden's father again used his influence on behalf of his son, interceding with the Secretary of War, family friend Jefferson Davis (who believed Crittenden to be innocent), and Thomas Hart Benton (who had served in the Senate with the elder Crittenden). The younger Crittenden was restored to duty on March 15, 1849. Other personality problems had surfaced during the Mexican War; Crittenden nearly participated in a duel, although the confrontation was defused by others. After a stay at Jefferson Barracks in St. Louis, Missouri, Crittenden traveled across the country to the Oregon Territory in 1849 with the Regiment of Mounted Riflemen. The regiment was stationed at the Columbia Barracks for a while before returning to Jefferson Barracks in 1851. Rumors of excessive drinking surfaced again, and his father suggested that he should resign from the military. The younger Crittenden promised to improve his behavior and, after an 1852 transfer to the Texas frontier, in the words of Prichard, he "served ably".

In 1856, David Meriwether, the territorial governor of New Mexico, gave Crittenden a bottle of brandy, but was told by Crittenden that he no longer drank. He was promoted to lieutenant colonel on December 30, 1856. Due to his influential connections, Crittenden received a leave of absence in 1859, which he used to travel in Europe. Crittenden was the post commander at Fort Union from late 1860 to early 1861. While serving on the frontier, he fought against Native Americans, including an action against Comanches on January 2, 1861, that brought him national newspaper attention. Damon R. Eubank, the writer of a work about the Crittenden family, writes that John's frequest interventions in his son's career prevented the younger Crittenden from learning from the issues that created the problems. According to Eubank, George "did not have a strong sense of duty" and could be easily convinced to make bad decisions, including in his choice of friendships. Eubank suggests that some of these personality issues could have stemmed from the death of his mother during his adolescence and pressure to fulfill his role as the family's firstborn son.

== American Civil War ==
=== Early wartime service ===
In the 1860 United States presidential election, a split in the Democratic Party assisted the victory of Abraham Lincoln and the Republican Party. Southern political leaders known as Fire-Eaters expressed fears that the incoming Republican administration would restrict slavery and support for secession grew in the South. John J. Crittenden, who had developed a reputation during his decades of public service for assisting in compromises, submitted a group of constitutional amendments in December 1860 known as the Crittenden Compromise, but the compromise was not approved. The state of South Carolina seceded in December, and six other southern states followed in early 1861. The seceding states formed the Confederate States of America in February. On the morning of April 12, Confederate military forces opened fire on Fort Sumter in Charleston Harbor; the American Civil War had begun. Four more states soon joined the Confederacy; Kentucky remained on the fence. George incorrectly expected his father to support the Confederacy. John J. Crittenden asked George to "be true to the government that has trusted in you. And stand fast by your national Flag", but George resigned from the United States Army on June 10. His brother Thomas remained with the Union during the war, rising to the rank of major general; another brother, Eugene, was also a Union officer. George's cousin Thomas Turpin Crittenden was also a Union brigadier general. Prichard notes that some sources claim that George was part of a conspiracy to establish Confederate control over the southwestern United States and that he tried to get the men of his regiment to join the Confederacy.

Crittenden was appointed a colonel in the Confederate service, and was promoted to brigadier general on August 15. Six days later, he was assigned to the Confederate Army of the Potomac in Virginia, where he led a brigade. Davis, a friend of the Crittenden family, was now the Confederate president. In late October, Davis sent a letter to Crittenden stating that he was considering appointing him to command a Confederate force to claim Kentucky for the Confederacy. On November 9, Crittenden was promoted to major general and assigned to command the Eastern District of Kentucky, in hopes that the Kentuckian would be popular with the residents of his home state and wanting a more experienced officer in regional command than the area's previous commander, Brigadier General Felix Zollicoffer, who remained in the area as a subordinate officer. Zollicoffer was a Tennessee politician and newspaper editor who had originally been made a general with political considerations in mind. Crittenden's command was the eastern part of the region commanded by Confederate General Albert Sidney Johnston, which extended west to Missouri and the Indian Territory. Johnston defined Crittenden's command as encompassing eastern Tennessee and the portions of Kentucky that Crittenden's army could occupy. The population of east Tennessee was largely opposed to the Confederacy, creating a volatile political situation. Davis was not comfortable with Crittenden's ability to handle the political situation, or his early efforts to resolve the matter. One of his political missteps involved Unionist newspaper editor William G. Brownlow. Crittenden attempted to encourage Brownlow to leave the Confederacy, offering him a pass through the lines. When Brownlow did not appear at the appointed time, he was arrested.

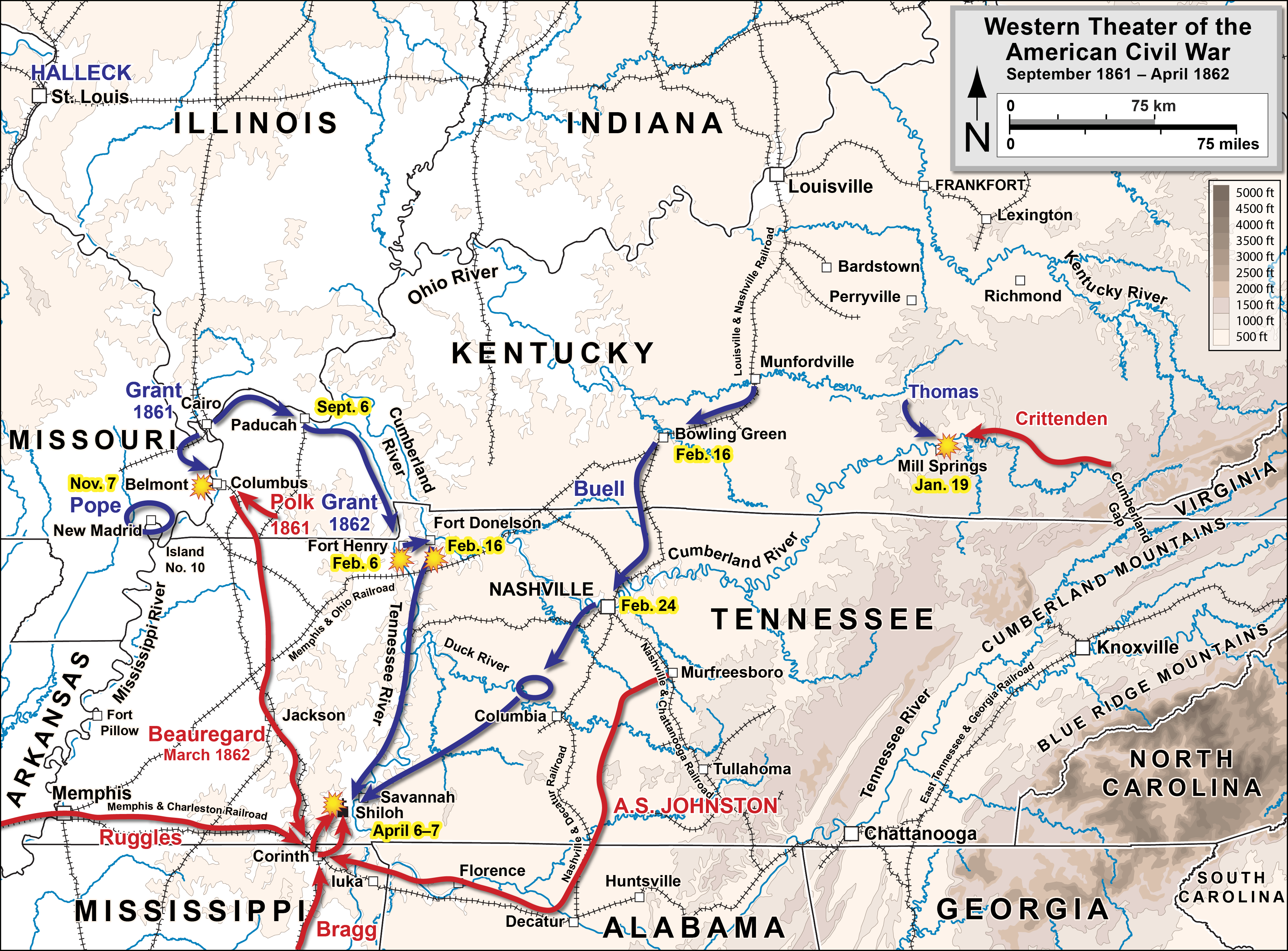
Map of early operations in the Western Theater of the American Civil War, including the movements that led to the Battle of Mill Springs - those of Pope, Grant, Thomas, and Buell are Union movements and the rest are Confederate

Crittenden set up his headquarters at Knoxville, Tennessee, on December 1, but was ordered to Richmond, Virginia, on December 8, for a conference with the Confederate government. This meeting resulted in orders for Crittenden to command Zollicoffer's troops, but not to exercise command in east Tennessee unless explicitly ordered to do so by Johnston. Northeastern Kentucky was also removed from Crittenden's command in favor of Brigadier General Humphrey Marshall. Crittenden's command now consisted of Zollicoffer's troops and another brigade commanded by Brigadier General William Carroll. Crittenden did not return to Knoxville until December 15. Meanwhile, Zollicoffer had advanced his troops from the Cumberland Gap to Mill Springs, Kentucky, a position on the south side of the Cumberland River with defensive advantages. However, the Tennessean soon decided to move across the river with his men, wanting to take aggressive offensive action. The inexperienced Zollicoffer also thought that having his troops in a bend of a river with the river to his back would protect the flanks and rear of his command, but instead the position was a trap. Although the Cumberland River could not be forded at Zollicoffer's position, it could be elsewhere. This created a situation where Union troops could cross the river and get around the Confederate position, and retreat over the river would be difficult and likely to result in a disastrous situation if his men were attacked in the process of crossing. Zollicoffer hoped to take offensive action, but his plan was dependent upon reinforcements and swift action, with delay increasing the riskiness of his position across the river. Carroll's brigade had been ordered to leave to join Zollicoffer on December 10, but this was not feasible at the time as the brigade had insufficient weapons. On December 16, Crittenden informed Johnston that he planned to leave with Carroll to join Zollicoffer two days later, but this was delayed by the need to prepare the troops for active service. The movement began on December 24.

Zollicoffer had informed Johnston that he intended to cross the river by sending a letter on November 30; Johnston received this message on December 4. Zollicoffer did not learn that Crittenden had been made his superior officer until December 10, by which time the latter had left for Richmond. By the time Zollicoffer learned that Crittenden had gone to Richmond, Crittenden was back in Knoxville. After his return from Richmond, he ordered Zollicoffer back across the river, but the latter officer considered this impossible and did not comply with the order. Communication between the two officers was hampered by Crittenden remaining in Knoxville; the historian Steven E. Woodworth writes that Crittenden "could and should" have traveled to Zollicoffer's position to observe the situation in person. Woodworth attributes part of the failure to get Zollicoffer's troops back to a more tenable position to Crittenden's recall to Richmond, but criticizes Crittenden's handling of the situation, writing that he "ought to have known of the movement in advance and prevented it", stating that results were "a severe indictment of Crittenden's generalship". Johnston's command style gave both Crittenden and Zollicoffer discretion. Eubank believes that the situation could possibly have been salvaged if Crittenden had journeyed to Kentucky in mid-December. Prichard disagrees with this conclusion, pointing to the fact that Crittenden only remained in Knoxville for eight days after his return from Richmond, the lack of specific guidance given to him, the distance between Knoxville and Zollicoffer, and the difficulties encountered when moving Carroll's force from Knoxville to Mill Springs.

=== Mill Springs and retreat ===
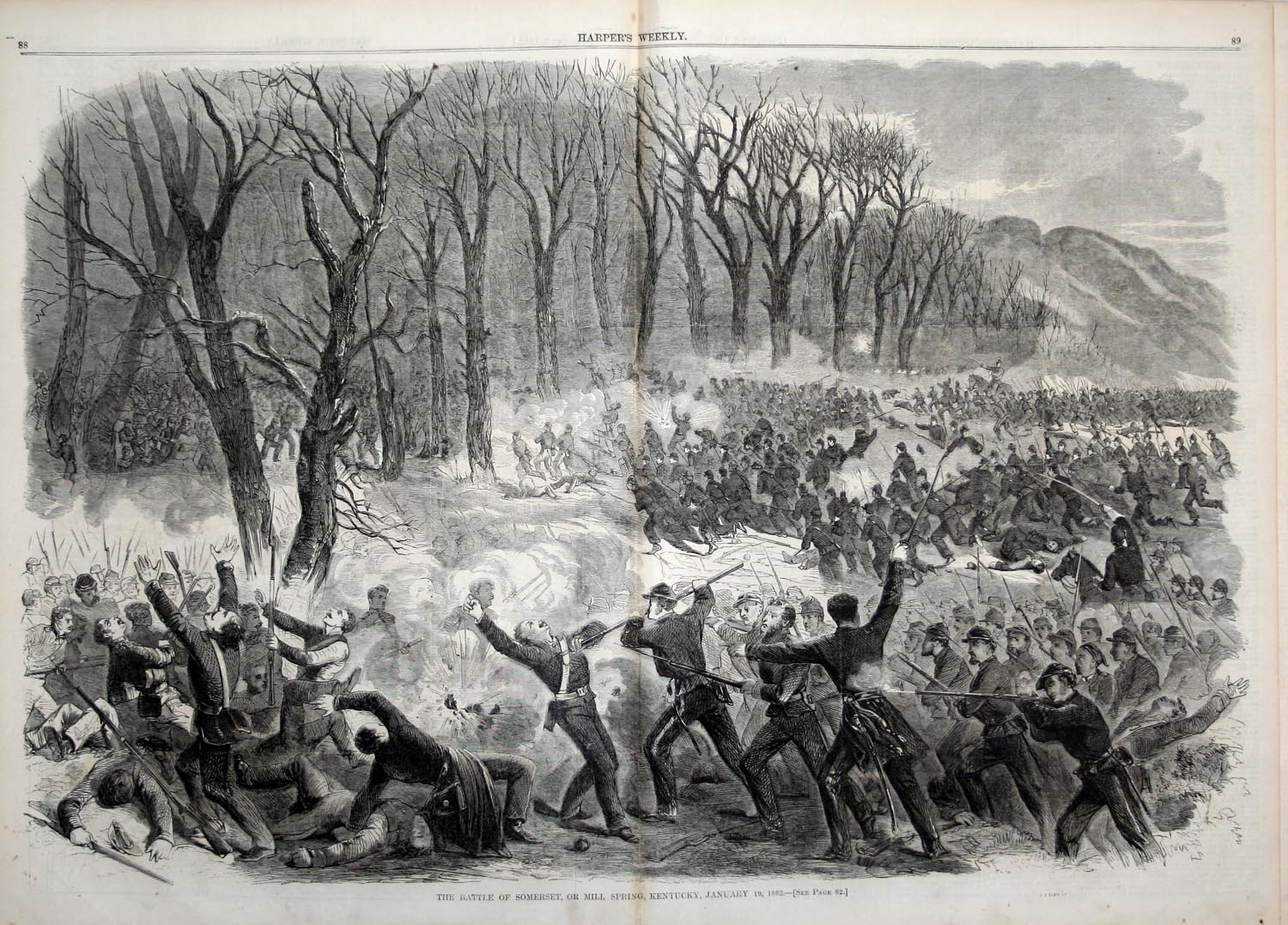
An 1862 depiction of the Battle of Mill Springs

Crittenden joined Zollicoffer in person on January 3, 1862, and several days later issued a statement to the civilian population of Kentucky which included the appeal "Will you join in the moving columns of the South or is the spirit of Kentucky dead?". He was surprised to find Zollicoffer still north of the Cumberland River. By January 18, Union forces commanded by Brigadier General George Thomas were at Logan's Cross Roads, nearing the Confederate camp. Another Union column, under the command of Brigadier General Albin Schoepf, was intending to join Thomas's troops, but was several miles away at Somerset and was separated from Thomas by a flooded creek. Outnumbered by the combined Union force, Crittenden decided to attack while his opponents were still separated and sent his troops on a night march against Thomas on the morning of January 19. There is some evidence that Zollicoffer opposed the action. The historian Thomas L. Connelly writes that Crittenden "did not understand the weakness of Zollicoffer's force", although Prichard disagrees with Connelly's criticism of Crittenden, arguing that a lack of supplies and Zollicoffer's previous actions left Crittenden with no choice but to attack. Crittenden's two brigades were poorly trained and badly armed; the weather during the march and battle was rainy and the antiquated flintlock muskets many of the Confederates were armed with were unreliable when wet. The Battle of Mill Springs began with a picket clash the morning of January 19 about 2 miles (3.2 km) from Thomas's camp at Logan's Cross Roads. Zollicoffer was killed early in the battle when he mistakenly rode up to the Union line. During the fighting, some troops from Schoepf's command were able to join Thomas. The battle was a Confederate defeat, and Crittenden's men fled from the field. The battle broke the right flank of Johnston's defensive line. While a Confederate force remained at Cumberland Gap, the area between Bowling Green, Kentucky, and Cumberland Gap was left undefended. The weather, the terrain, and the wishes of his commanding officer prevented Thomas from pushing further into Kentucky after the battle.

Schoepf's brigade finished arriving late on the day of the battle. Anticipating a follow-up attack from the combined Union forces, Crittenden ordered a retreat across the river. The panicked Confederate troops abandoned their wounded comrades and their artillery during the crossing. Crittenden's retreat continued all the way to Gainsboro, Tennessee, at which point his army was, in the words of Prichard, "nothing more than an armed mob". Rumors spread that Crittenden had been drunk during the battle, and Woodworth considers them to possibly have been true. Eubank believes that it is very likely that Crittenden had been drinking to some extent before the battle, although the degree of his insobriety is unclear, and states that he "clearly was drunk" during the retreat. Prichard cites research by Kenneth Hafendorfer that found no proof that Crittenden was intoxicated during the battle, although Hafendorfer believed that Crittenden was drunk during the nighttime retreat. Prichard writes that "despite his bouts of heavy drinking, Crittenden never disgraced himself on the battlefield". Further allegations of treason and "constant inebriation" spread. Woodworth summarizes the character traits shown by Crittenden during the campaign as "irresponsible, lazy, alcoholic". The deceased Zollicoffer was not blamed for the defeat, and even Union newspapers ridiculed Crittenden. John believed that his son had been "deluded" by those around him. Davis believed Crittenden to be innocent of the charges against him, but authorized Johnston to conduct an investigation. His troops did not want to remain under his command.

On February 1, Crittenden requested that a court of inquiry be opened about his conduct. A week later, communication arrived from the Confederate States Secretary of War Judah P. Benjamin that east Tennessee would be transferred to the command of Brigadier General Simon Bolivar Buckner, freeing up Crittenden to serve with the main Confederate force. Davis advocated disbanding Crittenden's demoralized division, but this did not happen. After a Confederate defeat at the Battle of Fort Donelson and the Union capture of Nashville, Tennessee, Crittenden was ordered to Murfreesboro, Tennessee, for a new command assignment. He took command of the 2nd Division of the Army of Central Kentucky on February 23. Johnston then concentrated his forces at Corinth, Mississippi. Crittenden was placed in command of the reserve corps of Johnston's army, but while stationed with his corps at Iuka, Mississippi, Major General William J. Hardee caught him and Carroll in a state of inebriation on April 1. At the time, Crittenden's troops were reported to have been "in a wretched state of discipline". Crittenden was arrested that day.

Ten days later, Crittenden submitted his resignation and requested to be placed on leave. His resignation was tabled by the Confederate government so that no action on it would be taken until his conduct could be investigated. On July 24, a court of inquiry was opened into his conduct, but it did not reach a decision. Another court of inquiry was opened on September 22, focusing specifically on a charge associated with an anti-drunkenness act passed after Crittenden's arrest. Crittenden objected to being tried under a law that was not in effect when the event in question had occurred. When he learned that this second trial was also expected to dissolve, he wrote to Confederate Adjutant General Samuel Cooper, questioning why he was being tried in accordance with a law not in effect at the time of the violation. Cooper decided that since Crittenden was not choosing to actively defend himself against the charges, but was instead basing his defense on a legal technicality, he should be allowed to resign. Crittenden believed that this finding would appear to be an admission of guilt on his part, and he protested to Davis. Davis ordered the offending phrases removed from the report, and Crittenden was allowed to resign. He resigned on October 23.

=== Late career and postbellum ===
On April 7, 1863, Crittenden re-entered active military service, now with the rank of colonel. He served in the backwater Department of Western Virginia, as a staff officer to Brigadier General John S. Williams. Although the region was not militarily important, it did contain important salt works and lead mines. In July, he played an active role in the Confederate defense against the Wytheville Raid. The next month, Confederate forces abandoned east Tennessee, and Union Major General Ambrose Burnside moved into the region. In September, Crittenden led a small force in a series of delaying actions against a Union cavalry advance, which enabled Williams to form a successful defensive line. In one of these actions, he fought against his brother Eugene, a Union colonel. The two met under a flag of truce on September 20. Crittenden's performance earned him praise from Confederate departmental commander Major General Samuel Jones. Crittenden continued as a staff officer in the region into early 1864. Brigadier General John Hunt Morgan took over departmental command in early 1864. As part of the defense against a Union cavalry raid aimed at Wytheville, Virginia, Crittenden commanded a small force holding a gap in a delaying action on May 10, buying enough time for Morgan to arrive and disperse the Union force. Jones praised Crittenden's handling of his force.

Crittenden was elevated to command the reorganized Department of Western Virginia and East Tennessee on May 31, as Morgan was commanding a raid in Kentucky and Brigadier General William Jones had been transferred out of the department. The majority of the troops in the department were reservists, and Crittenden requested to be relieved of the departmental command on June 4. Eubank believes that after the Mill Springs debacle, Crittenden wanted to avoid the public scrutiny that would have accompanied such a position. Despite his request, he was retained in command. As departmental commander, his primary task was to coordinate troop movements with neighboring departments. On July 30, Crittenden was placed in command of a cavalry force in east Tennessee, operating in the Bulls Gap area. Morgan moved with his troops into the area in September, causing Crittenden to request to be relieved of command, but Morgan was killed on September 4. Crittenden was tasked with coordinating Morgan's public funeral. On September 5, Crittenden was reassigned to be the regional inspector general. He was assigned to the staff of Major General John C. Breckinridge on October 12. In mid-November, he commanded a 300-man force that made a diversionary attack during the Battle of Bull's Gap, in which Confederate assaults were unsuccessful but the Union force withdrew in the face of Confederate reinforcements. Crittenden was present at the December 17 and 18 Battle of Marion, in which Breckinridge's troops delayed a Union advance, but were forced to withdraw, allowing Union cavalry to raid Saltville, Virginia, and damage the salt works and destroy railroad infrastructure there.

Crittenden spent the rest of the war performing administrative tasks, most of the time while stationed at Wytheville. By April 1865, Brigadier General John Echols was in command of the department. Learning of the Union capture of Richmond, and the surrender of Confederate General Robert E. Lee, Echols led his command to join Confederate General Joseph E. Johnston in North Carolina. Crittenden did not reach Johnston's army before it surrendered, and was paroled on May 5. He returned to Kentucky, where there was an indictment in the federal court system against him for treason, and was granted a pardon on November 9, 1867. In the words of Prichard, Crittenden spent the rest of his life in "relative obscurity". In 1870, he received a pension from the state of Texas related to his service in the Mier campaign. Eubank believes that Crittenden could have attempted a political career in postwar Kentucky, given his family connections and the pro-Confederate developments in Kentucky culture after the war, but Crittenden did not have such ambitions. The historian Lawrence L. Hewitt states that Crittenden "became a hero among his fellow Kentuckians", as Kentucky culture became more pro-Confederate after the abolition of slavery. From 1867 to 1874, he was the state librarian of Kentucky. He died at the home of his sister Mrs. Cornelia Young in Danville on November 27, 1880. He had never married. He was buried next to his father in the Frankfort Cemetery.

== See also ==
- List of American Civil War generals (Confederate)

== Sources ==
- Bearss, Edwin C. (2007) [2006]. Fields of Honor. Washington, D.C.: National Geographic. ISBN 978-1-4262-0093-9.
- Connelly, Thomas Lawrence (1993) [1967]. Army of the Heartland: The Army of Tennessee, 1861–1862. Baton Rouge, Louisiana: Louisiana State University Press. ISBN 0-8071-0404-3.
- Eicher, John H.; Eicher, David J. (2001). Civil War High Commands. Stanford, California: Stanford University Press. ISBN 978-0-8047-3641-1.
- Eisenhower, John S. D. (2000) [1989]. So Far From God: The U.S. War with Mexico, 1846–1848 (Oklahoma Paperback ed.). Norman, Oklahoma: University of Oklahoma Press. ISBN 978-0-8061-3279-2.
- Eubank, Damon R. (2009). In the Shadow of the Patriarch: The John J. Crittenden Family in War and Peace. Macon, Georgia: Mercer University Press. ISBN 978-0-88146-151-0.
- Friend, Llerena B., ed. (1965). "Sidelights and Supplements on the Perote Prisoners". The Southwestern Historical Quarterly. 68 (3): 366–374. ISSN 0038-478X. OCLC 9972975822.
- Nelson, Paul David (1999). "Crittenden, George Bibb". In Garraty, John A.; Carnes, Mark C. (eds.). American National Biography. Vol. 5. Oxford: Oxford University Press. pp. 739–740. ISBN 0-19-512784-6.
- Hewitt, Lawrence L. (1991). "George Bibb Crittenden". In Davis, William C. (ed.). The Confederate General. Vol. 2. Harrisburg, Pennsylvania: National Historical Society. pp. 42–43. ISBN 9780918678645.
- McKnight, Brian D. (2006). Contested Borderland: The Civil War in Appalachian Kentucky and Virginia. Lexington, Kentucky: University Press of Kentucky. ISBN 978-0-8131-2389-9.
- Prichard, James M. (2008). "Maj. Gen. George Bibb Crittenden". In Allardice, Bruce S.; Hewitt, Lawrence Lee (eds.). Kentuckians in Gray: Confederate Generals and Field Officers of the Bluegrass State. Lexington, Kentucky: University Press of Kentucky. pp. 69–75. ISBN 978-0-8131-2475-9.
- Prichard, James M. (2010). "Glory Denied: The Hard Fate of George B. Crittenden". In Hewitt, Lawrence Lee; Bergeron Jr., Arthur W. (eds.). Confederate Generals in the Western Theater. Vol. 2. Knoxville, Tennessee: University of Tennessee Press. pp. 1–24. ISBN 978-1-57233-699-5.
- Smith, Timothy B. (2023). The Iron Dice of Battle: Albert Sidney Johnston and the Civil War in the West. Baton Rouge, Louisiana: Louisiana State University Press. ISBN 978-0-8071-8048-8.
- Warner, Ezra J. (2006) [1959]. Generals in Gray: Lives of the Confederate Commanders (Louisiana Paperback ed.). Baton Rouge, Louisiana: Louisiana State University Press. ISBN 978-0-8071-3150-3.
- Warner, Ezra J. (2006b) [1964]. Generals in Blue: Lives of the Union Commanders. Baton Rouge, Louisiana: Louisiana State University Press. ISBN 0-8071-3149-0.
- Welcher, Frank J. (1993). The Union Army 1861–1865: Organization and Operations. Vol. II: The Western Theater. Bloomington, Indiana: Indiana University Press. ISBN 0-253-36454-X.
- Woodworth, Steven E. (1990). Jefferson Davis and His Generals: The Failure of Confederate Command in the West. Lawrence, Kansas: University Press of Kansas. ISBN 0-7006-0567-3.
