= 2nd Kentucky Infantry Regiment (Union) =

- Active: June 1861 - June 19, 1864
- Country: United States
- Allegiance: Union
- Branch: Infantry
- Engagements: Battle of Scary Creek; Battle of Shiloh; Siege of Corinth; Battle of Perryville; Battle of Stones River; Tullahoma Campaign; Battle of Chickamauga; Chattanooga campaign

The 2nd Kentucky Infantry Regiment was an infantry regiment that served in the Union army during the American Civil War.

== Service ==
The 2nd Kentucky Infantry Regiment was organized at Camp Clay near Cincinnati, Ohio, May - June 1861. It was organized in Ohio while Kentucky tried to remain neutral. Although credited to Kentucky, the regiment was almost entirely composed by Ohio volunteers.

The regiment moved to the Kanawha Valley, Virginia, July 10 where it was attached to Kanawha Brigade, Western Virginia, to October 1861. District of the Kanawha, Western Virginia, to January 1862. 22nd Brigade, Army of the Ohio, to February 1862. 22nd Brigade, 4th Division, Army of the Ohio, to September 1862. 22nd Brigade, 4th Division, II Corps, Army of the Ohio, to November 1862. 1st Brigade, 2nd Division, Left Wing, XIV Corps, Army of the Cumberland, to January 1863. 1st Brigade, 2nd Division, XXI Corps, Army of the Cumberland, to October 1863. 1st Brigade, 1st Division, IV Corps, to June 1864.

The 2nd Kentucky Infantry mustered out of service on June 19, 1864, at Covington, Kentucky.

== Detailed service ==
Campaign in western Virginia July to October 1861. Red House July 13 (Companies A, B, D, F, and K). Barboursville July 16. Scarrytown July 17. Gauley's Bridge September 1. Operations in Kanawha Valley October 19-November 16. Attack on Gauley by Floyd's Batteries November 1–9. Gauley Bridge November 10. At Charlestown, Virginia, December 4 to January 24, 1862. Moved to Louisville, Kentucky, then to Bardstown February 5. March to Nashville, Tennessee, February 14-March 12. March to Savannah, Tennessee, March 13-April 5. Battle of Shiloh April 6–7. Advance on and siege of Corinth, Mississippi, April 29-May 30. Phillips' Creek, Widow Serratt's, May 21. Bridge Creek, before Corinth, May 28. Occupation of Corinth May 30. Pursuit to Booneville May 31-June 6. Buell's Campaign in northern Alabama and middle Tennessee June to August, March to Louisville, Kentucky, in pursuit of Bragg August 21-September 25. Pursuit of Bragg to London, Kentucky, October 1–22. Battle of Perryville October 8. Camp Wild Cat October 17. Destruction of Salt Works at Goose Creek October 23–24. March to Nashville, Tennessee, October 24-November 9. Duty at Nashville until December 26. Advance on Murfreesboro December 26–30. Lavergne December 26–27. Battle of Stones River December 30–31, 1862 and January 1–3, 1863. Duty at Murfreesboro and Cripple Creek until June. Expedition to Woodbury April 2. Action at Snow Hill, Woodbury, April 3. Tullahoma Campaign June 24-July 7. At Manchester July 9 to August 16. Passage of Cumberland Mountains and Tennessee River and Chickamauga Campaign August 16-September 22. Pea Vine Creek, Georgia, September 10. Lee and Gordon's Mills September 11–13. Battle of Chickamauga, September 19–20. Siege of Chattanooga September 24-October 27. Reopening of Tennessee River October 26–29. At Bridgeport, Alabama, October 28, 1863, to January 26, 1864. (A detachment at Ringgold Gap, Georgia, November 27, 1863, and on demonstration on Dalton February 22–27, 1864. Near Dalton February 23. Tunnel Hill, Buzzard's Roost Gap and Rocky Faced Ridge February 23–25.) At Ooltewah, Georgia, until May 17, and at Resaca until June 3. Ordered home June 3. Operations against Morgan in Kentucky until June 19. Mt. Sterling June 9.

== Casualties ==
The regiment lost a total of 165 men during service; 3 officers and 74 enlisted men killed or mortally wounded, 1 officer and 87 enlisted men died of disease.

== Commanders ==
- Colonel William E. Woodruff
- Colonel Thomas D. Sedgewick

== See also ==
- List of Kentucky Civil War Units
- Kentucky in the Civil War
