= Thomas Turpin Crittenden =

Union officer in the American Civil War (1825–1905)

- Thomas Turpin Crittenden
- Born: October 16, 1825; Huntsville, Alabama, US
- Died: September 5, 1905 (aged 79); East Gloucester, Massachusetts, US
- Burial place: Arlington National Cemetery
- Military career
- Allegiance: United States; Union
- Branch: United States Army; Union Army
- Service years: 1846–1847, 1861–1863
- Rank: Brigadier General
- Commands: 6th Indiana Infantry Regiment; 3rd Brigade, 1st Division, XX Corps
- Conflicts: Mexican–American War; American Civil War; Battle of Shiloh; First Battle of Murfreesboro

Thomas Turpin Crittenden (October 16, 1825 – September 5, 1905) was a Union general in the American Civil War.

== Birth and early years ==
Crittenden was born in Huntsville, Alabama, but his family moved to Texas shortly thereafter. He was a nephew of Senator John J. Crittenden of Kentucky, and a first cousin of Confederate general George B. Crittenden and Union general Thomas L. Crittenden. He grew up in Texas and attended Transylvania College at Lexington, Kentucky. He practiced law in Missouri until the outbreak of the Mexican–American War in 1846, when he enlisted in a Missouri volunteer regiment and was made a second lieutenant. The next year, he relocated to Madison, Indiana, where he resumed his legal career.

== Civil War ==
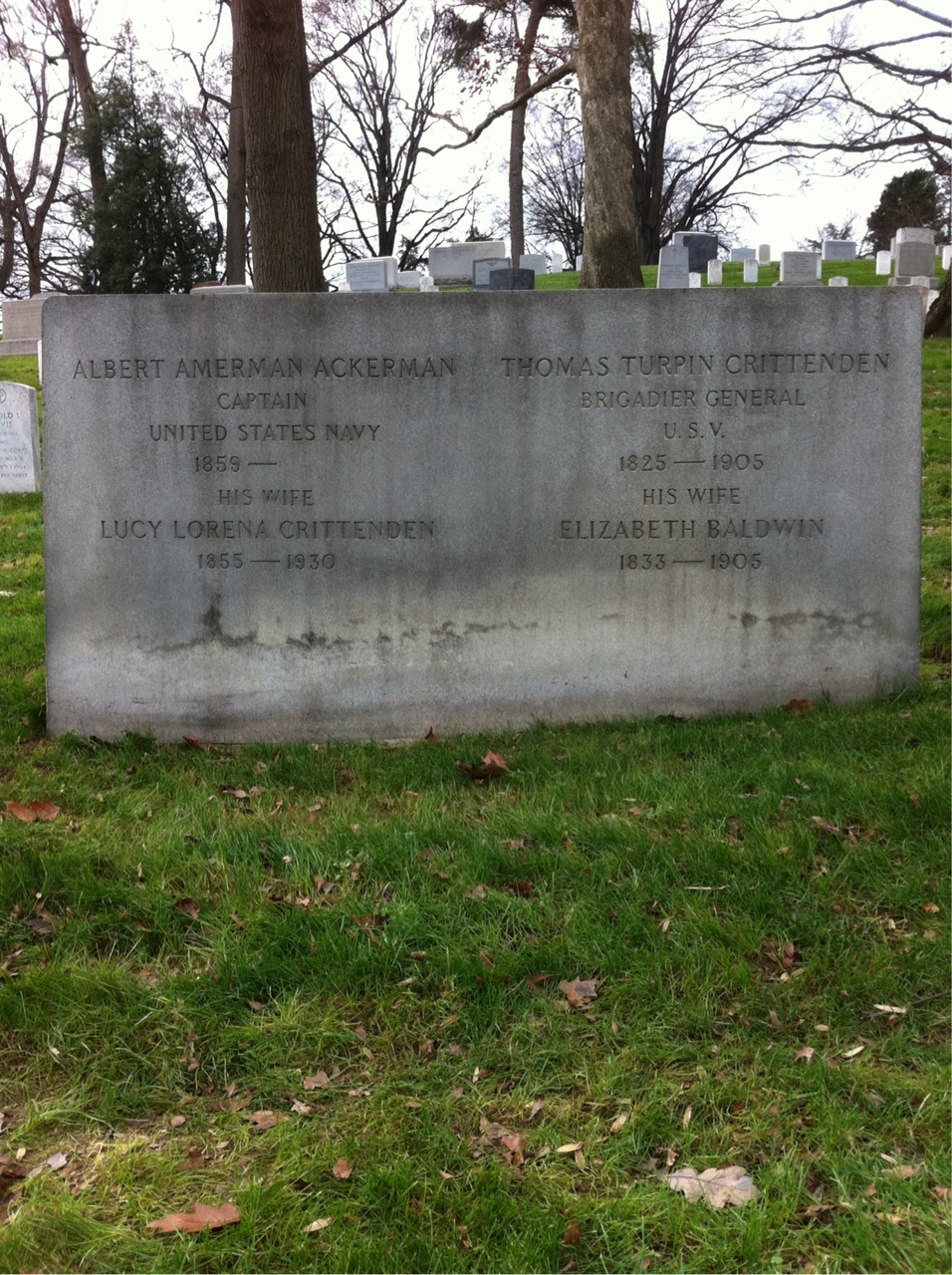
Grave at Arlington National Cemetery

Five days after the American Civil War began with the firing on Fort Sumter, Crittenden volunteered for the Union Army and was commissioned as captain of a company in the 6th Regiment Indiana Infantry (3 months). Little more than a week later, he became the regiment's colonel. Crittenden led his regiment into what is now West Virginia, taking part in several small battles. On August 2, 1861, the regiment was discharged, having only enlisted for 90 days. Crittenden reorganized his regiment for three years of service, and on September 20, 1861, he led his men into the officially neutral state of Kentucky. They spent the winter near Bowling Green, and marched to take part in the battle of Shiloh, Tennessee, arriving in time for the second day. Later that month, in April 1862, Crittenden was commissioned a brigadier general.

On July 13, 1862, just weeks after taking charge of the Union garrison at Murfreesboro, Tennessee, Crittenden and his entire command were captured by Nathan Bedford Forrest's cavalrymen. Crittenden was exchanged in October 1862, but his career had been ruined. Early in 1863, he was given command of a brigade previously commanded by William E. Woodruff, but realized he was no longer viewed with confidence. He resigned from the army in May 1863 and saw no further military service.

After the war, Crittenden moved to Washington, D.C., where he practiced law, including before the U.S. Supreme Court. In 1885, he moved to distant San Diego, California, where he became a real estate developer. He died at the age of 79 while on a visit to East Gloucester, Massachusetts. He is buried at Arlington National Cemetery.

== See also ==
- List of American Civil War generals (Union)
