= Thomas Leonidas Crittenden =

Union officer in the American Civil War (1819–1893)

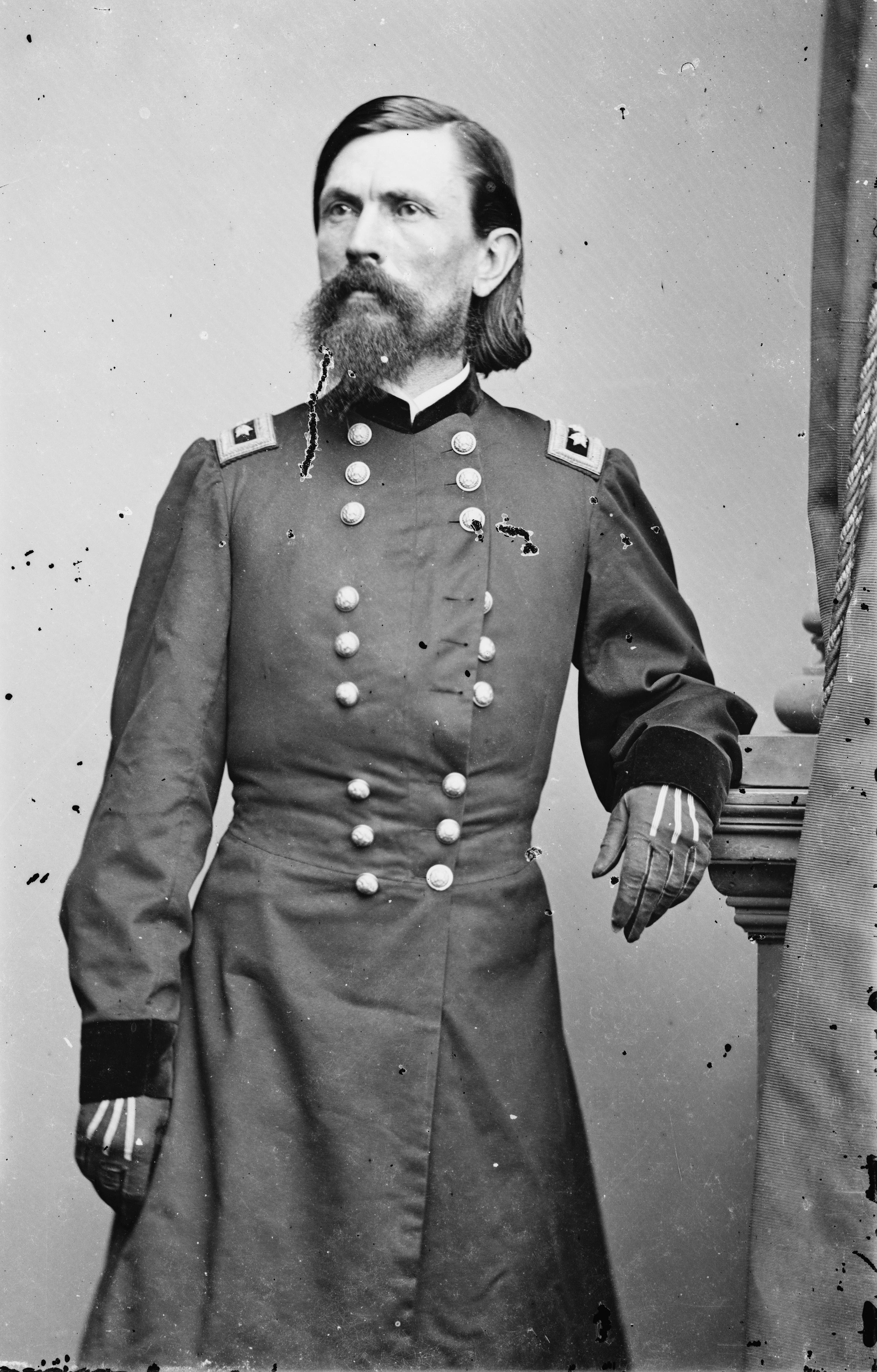
- Born: May 15, 1819; Russellville, Kentucky, U.S.
- Died: October 23, 1893 (aged 74); Annadale, Staten Island, New York, U.S.
- Burial place: Frankfort Cemetery, Frankfort, Kentucky
- Military career
- Allegiance: United States of America; Union
- Branch: United States Army; Union Army
- Service years: 1847–1848, 1861–1864, 1866–1881
- Rank: Major General
- Units: 3rd Kentucky Volunteers; 17th Infantry
- Commands: 5th Division, Army of the Ohio; II Corps; XXI Corps; 1st Division, IX Corps
- Conflicts: Mexican–American War; American Civil War; Battle of Shiloh; Battle of Perryville; Battle of Stones River; Tullahoma Campaign; Battle of Chickamauga; Battle of Spotsylvania; Battle of Cold Harbor

Thomas Leonidas Crittenden (May 15, 1819 – October 23, 1893) was an American statesman, politician, soldier and lawyer from the U.S. state of Kentucky. He served as a general for the Union during the American Civil War. His family was fairly typical for Kentucky, in that he and his father supported the Union during the war, but his elder brother fought for the Confederacy.

== Early life ==
Crittenden was born in Russellville, Kentucky, the son of U.S. Senator John J. Crittenden, who later became 17th governor of Kentucky. He was also brother of Confederate general George B. Crittenden, and author Ann Mary Butler Crittenden Coleman, as well as a cousin of Union general Thomas Turpin Crittenden. He married Catherine Todd, the daughter of his father's second wife. Their son, John Jordan Crittenden III, served in the United States Army and died with Lt. Col. George Armstrong Custer at the Battle of Little Bighorn in 1876.

Crittenden was admitted to the bar and served in the United States Army during Mexican–American War as a volunteer aide to General Zachary Taylor and as lieutenant colonel of the 3rd Kentucky Volunteer Infantry from 1847 to 1848. After the war's end, he served as U.S. consul in Liverpool.

== Civil War ==
When the Civil War began in 1861, Kentucky was a state that declared its neutrality and was at risk of supporting the Confederacy. Crittenden and his father remained loyal to the Union, but his brother joined the Confederate Army, a common occurrence in the border states. Crittenden had been a major general in the Kentucky militia since 1860. He was appointed brigadier general of volunteers in September and placed in command of the 5th Division in the Army of the Ohio. He led the division at the Battle of Shiloh in 1862. After Shiloh, he was appointed major general of volunteers and commanded the II Corps in the Army of the Ohio during the Perryville Campaign although his corps was only lightly engaged in the fighting.

When Maj. Gen. William S. Rosecrans assumed command of the army, Crittenden's forces were redesignated the Left Wing of the Army of the Cumberland and were heavily engaged at the Battle of Stones River. (He received a brevet promotion to brigadier general in the regular army in 1867 for his service at Stones River.) The Army of the Cumberland was reorganized and Crittenden's corps was once again renamed, this time the XXI Corps. He led the corps through the Tullahoma Campaign and at the Battle of Chickamauga. Crittenden and fellow corps commander Alexander McDowell McCook were blamed for the defeat and relieved of command, but both were later exonerated and acquitted of any charges. During the Battle of Spotsylvania in 1864, Brig. Gen. Thomas G. Stevenson was killed leading the 1st Division, IX Corps. Stevenson's successor was Col. Daniel Leasure. The decision was made to replace the colonel with a more experienced commander and General Crittenden was chosen to take command of the division. He assumed command on May 12 and led it during the final days of Spotsylvania and through the Battle of Cold Harbor, before resigning on December 13, 1864.

== Postbellum career ==
After the war, Crittenden served as the state treasurer of Kentucky and was appointed as a colonel and then brevetted to brigadier general in the regular army before retiring in 1881. He was elected a member of the Maryland Society of the Cincinnati in 1883. He was also a veteran companion of the Military Order of the Loyal Legion of the United States. He died in Annadale, Staten Island, New York, and is buried in Frankfort, Kentucky.

A street in Chickamauga, Georgia, is named after him.

A United States Army post was named after him, Fort Crittenden, which had been originally called Camp Crittenden, and was in operation during the Apache Wars. Fort Crittenden was located three miles from Sonoita, Arizona, along Sonoita Creek.

== See also ==
- List of American Civil War generals (Union)
