= Battle of Cedar Mountain order of battle: Union =

Commanders and army units who fought in the Battle of Cedar Mountain during the Civil War

The following Union army units and commanders fought in the Battle of Cedar Mountain of the American Civil War. The Confederate order of battle is shown separately.

== Military Rank Abbreviations Used ==
- MG = Major General
- BG = Brigadier General
- Col = Colonel
- Ltc = Lieutenant Colonel
- Maj = Major
- Cpt = Captain
- Lt = Lieutenant

== Army of Virginia ==
Unattached units

Pope’s escort

1st Ohio Cavalry (detachment)

=== II Corps ===
MG Nathaniel Banks

Escort

1st Michigan Cavalry (detachment)
5th New York Cavalry (detachment)
1st Virginia Cavalry (detachment)

Division	Brigade	Regiments and Others
First Division; BG Alpheus S. Williams	1st Brigade BG Samuel W. Crawford	5th Connecticut: Col George D. Chapman (w/c); 10th Maine: Col George L. Beal; 28th New York: Col Dudley Donnelly (mw), Ltc Edwin F. Brown (w/c); 46th Pennsylvania: Col Joseph Knipe (w), Ltc James L. Selfridge
First Division; BG Alpheus S. Williams	3rd Brigade BG George H. Gordon	27th Indiana: Col Silas Colgrove; 2nd Massachusetts: Col George L. Andrews; 3rd Wisconsin: Col Thomas H. Ruger; Zouaves d’Afrique: (Collis’s company): Lt S. A. Barthoulot
Second Division; BG Christopher C. Augur (w); BG Henry Prince (c); BG George S. Greene	1st Brigade BG John W. Geary (w); Col Charles Candy	5th Ohio: Ltc John H. Patrick; 7th Ohio: Col William R. Creighton (w); 29th Ohio: Cpt Wilbur F. Stevens; 66th Ohio: Col Charles Candy
Second Division; BG Christopher C. Augur (w); BG Henry Prince (c); BG George S. Greene	2nd Brigade BG Henry Prince (c); Col David P. DeWitt	3rd Maryland: Col David P. DeWitt; 102nd New York: Maj Joseph C. Lane; 109th Pennsylvania: Col Henry J. Stainrook (w); 111th Pennsylvania: Maj Thomas M. Walker; 8th US and 12th US Battalion: Cpt Thomas G. Pitcher (w)
Second Division; BG Christopher C. Augur (w); BG Henry Prince (c); BG George S. Greene	3rd Brigade BG George S. Greene; Col James A. Tait	1st District of Columbia: Col James A. Tait; 78th New York: Ltc Jonathan Austin
	Corps Artillery Cpt Clermont L. Best	4th Battery, Maine Light Artillery: Cpt O'Neil W. Robinson; 6th Battery, Maine Light Artillery: Cpt Freeman McGilvery; Battery K, 1st New York Light Artillery: Cpt Lorenzo Crounse; Battery L, 1st New York Light Artillery: Cpt John A. Reynolds; Battery M, 1st New York Light Artillery: Cpt George W. Cothran; Battery L, 2nd New York Artillery: Cpt Jacob Roemer; 10th Battery, New York Light Artillery: Cpt John T. Bruen; Battery E, Pennsylvania Light Artillery: Cpt Joseph M. Knap; Battery F, 4th U.S. Artillery: Lt Edward D. Muhlenberg

=== III Corps ===
MG Irvin McDowell

Division	Brigade	Regiments and Others
Second Division; BG James B. Ricketts	1st Brigade BG Abram Duryée	97th New York: Ltc John P. Spofford; 104th New York: Maj Lewis C. Skinner; 105th New York: Col James M. Fuller; 107th Pennsylvania: Ltc Robert W. McAllen
Second Division; BG James B. Ricketts	2nd Brigade BG Zealous B. Tower	26th New York: Col William H. Christian; 94th New York: Adrian Rowe Root; 88th Pennsylvania: Col George P. McLean; 90th Pennsylvania: Col Peter Lyle
Second Division; BG James B. Ricketts	3rd Brigade BG George L. Hartsuff	12th Massachusetts: Col Fletcher Webster; 13th Massachusetts: Col Samuel H. Leonard; 83rd New York: Col John W. Stiles; 11th Pennsylvania: Col Richard Coulter
Second Division; BG James B. Ricketts	4th Brigade Col Samuel S. Carroll	7th Indiana: Ltc John F. Cheek; 84th Pennsylvania: Col Samuel M. Bowman; 110th Pennsylvania: Col William D. Lewis Jr.; 1st West Virginia: Col Joseph Thoburn
Second Division; BG James B. Ricketts	Artillery Maj Davis Tillson	2nd Battery, Maine Light Artillery: Cpt James A. Hall; 5th Battery, Maine Light Artillery: Cpt George F. Leppien; Battery F, 1st Pennsylvania Light Artillery: Cpt Ezra W. Matthews; Independent Battery C, Pennsylvania Light Artillery: Cpt James Thompson
	Cavalry Brigade BG George D. Bayard	1st Maine Cavalry: Col Samuel H. Allen; 1st New Jersey Cavalry: Ltc Joseph Karge; 1st Pennsylvania Cavalry: Col Owen Jones; 1st Rhode Island Cavalry: Col Alfred N. Duffie
