= Battle of Cedar Mountain order of battle =

The order of battle for the Battle of Cedar Mountain includes:

- Battle of Cedar Mountain order of battle: Confederate
- Battle of Cedar Mountain order of battle: Union
