= Court-martial of Fitz John Porter =

American military trial

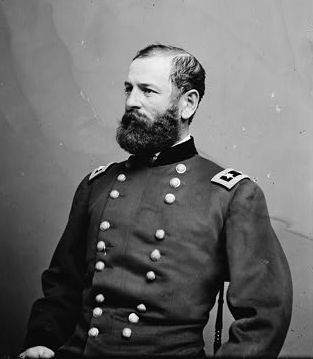
Fitz John Porter

The court-martial of Fitz John Porter (November 25, 1862 – January 22, 1863) was a major event of the American Civil War. Major General Fitz John Porter was found guilty of disobeying a lawful order and misconduct in front of the enemy, and was removed from command based on internal political machinations of the Union Army. The court-martial was later found to be unjust and overturned, and Porter was reinstated in the United States Army.

== Background ==
Porter was a career army officer from a family of famous naval officers, including his cousins David Farragut and David Dixon Porter, the first four-star admirals in the United States Navy. He graduated from West Point in 1845, eighth in his class, and served with great distinction as an artillery officer in the Mexican War. After the war, Porter served in various posts, including a stint as an instructor of artillery at West Point, where he became good friends with both George B. McClellan and William B. Franklin and, eventually, post adjutant for Robert E. Lee.

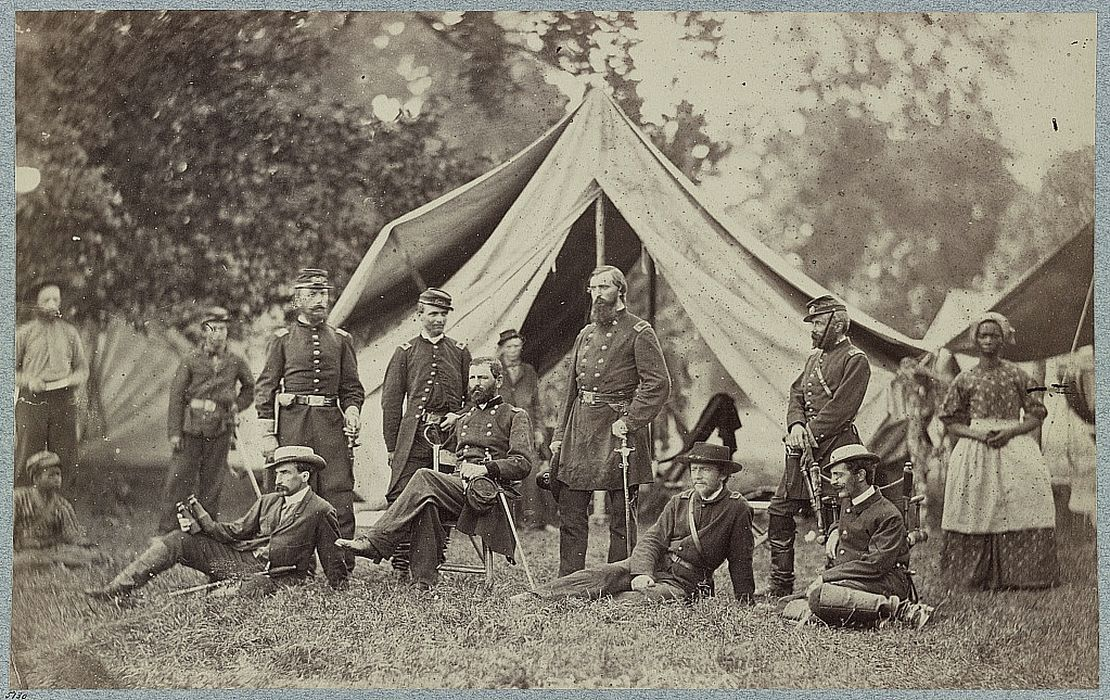
Porter (seated in chair) and staff

As tensions increased in 1860, Porter traveled to threatened locations in the South in order to prepare for the upcoming conflict, including Charleston, South Carolina, where he advised Major Robert Anderson be placed in charge of the defenses and that they be consolidated at Fort Sumter. When war broke out, he initially served on the staff of Major General Robert Patterson, but when his old friend McClellan was asked to take charge of the Army of the Potomac he was transferred to command a division at the new commander's explicit request.

When McClellan took the Army of the Potomac south for the Peninsula Campaign, he reorganized the II, III, and IV Corps to create two new provisional units, the V Corps under Porter, and the VI Corps under Franklin. McClellan trusted his old friends much more than the other corps commanders and wanted subordinates he considered loyal. He relied, in particular, on Porter, who often acted as his surrogate on the battlefield during McClellan's frequent absences. One such instance, the Battle of Malvern Hill, especially cemented Porter's reputation as a superb commander on the battlefield.

== Porter's command at the Second Battle of Bull Run ==
After the failure of McClellan's Peninsula Campaign, Porter's corps was one of the corps reassigned to the Army of Virginia under Major General John Pope. Porter shared his commander and friend's dislike for Pope both personally and professionally. As he moved his corps into position at Aquia Creek near Fredericksburg, Porter sent a number of telegrams to Major General Ambrose Burnside complaining about Pope's poor leadership and handling of the army. Burnside, who, along with many others, shared Porter's low opinion of Pope's abilities, forwarded these communications to McClellan, General-in-Chief Henry Halleck, Secretary of War Edwin Stanton, and President Abraham Lincoln. Halleck, Stanton, and Lincoln were not pleased, since Pope had been their choice to lead in an attempt to sideline the uncooperative McClellan. The President was especially displeased, since Pope was a personal friend.

The major-general commanding directs that you start at 1 o'clock to-night, and come forward with your whole corps...Hooker has had very severe action with the enemy...[and the enemy has] been driven back, but is retiring along the railroad. We must drive him from Manassas, and clear the country between that place and Gainesville, where McDowell is... It is necessary, on all accounts, that you should be here by daylight.

— Maj. Gen. John Pope, August 27, 6:30pm

On August 27, the left wing of the Army of Northern Virginia under Thomas J. "Stonewall" Jackson seized Pope's supply depot at Manassas Junction. Pope believed the main Confederate army to be somewhere south of his force and so became panicked and sent a flurry of orders. In a repetitive and unorganized telegram sent to Porter, Pope ordered him to join him at Bristoe Station by morning with his corps, or as much of his corps as he could gather by 1:00 in the morning. He was also to send word to another Union corps commander, Major General Nathaniel P. Banks, to secure Warrenton Junction.

Porter consulted with his divisional commanders, Major General George W. Morell and Brigadier General George Sykes, about the feasibility of marching that evening. Both generals were against the movement, they would later testify, but Porter wanted to go forward. Morrell and Sykes were finally able to convince Porter that the way was too dark and they were too unsure of the location of the Confederate forces in order to move in the dark and the order to move at 1:00 am was disregarded and instead the V Corps moved to Bristoe Station the morning of August 28. By 5:30 that evening – when Jackson's men first engaged a division from the corps of Major General Irvin McDowell – Porter had moved his men to Greenwich, making him the most westerly located corps commander in the Army of Virginia.

During the next morning, August 29, Pope's attention was occupied along the unfinished railroad grade that Jackson was using as defense while the Union army assaulted in wave after wave. Meanwhile, Porter, now joined with parts of McDowell's III Corps and the general himself, repulsed an exploratory attack by the Confederate cavalry division under Major General J.E.B. Stuart. Porter and McDowell had no sooner halted their advance when they received an order from Pope, now known as the "Joint Order." Historian John J. Hennessy described the order as a "masterpiece of contradiction and obfuscation that would become the focal point of decades of wrangling." It described the attacks on Jackson's left, which were already underway, but was unclear about what Porter and McDowell were supposed to do. Rather than moving "to" Gainesville and striking Jackson's supposedly unprotected right flank, it described a move "toward" Gainesville and "as soon as communication is established [with the other divisions] the whole command shall halt. It may be necessary to fall back behind Bull Run to Centreville tonight." Nowhere in the order did Pope explicitly direct Porter and McDowell to attack and he concluded the order with "If any considerable advantages are to be gained from departing from this order it will not be strictly carried out," rendering the document virtually useless as a military order.

Pope launched another assault on Jackson, believing that Porter and McDowell would be attacking Jackson's right-flank at any moment. But Brigadier General John Buford had arrived from Thoroughfare Gap to report that Major General James Longstreet's wing of the Army of Northern Virginia had broken out of the Shenandoah Valley and was on its way to the battlefield. In fact, by noon, the first units of Longstreet's corps were already taking up positions guarding Jackson's right. McDowell, the senior commander, decided to not move the two corps to Gainesville and attack, but, for unknown reasons, did not forward Buford's report to Pope.

Your line of march brings you in on the enemy's right flank. I desire you to push forward into action at once on the enemy's flank, and, if possible, on his rear, keeping your right in communication with General Reynolds. The enemy is massed in the woods in front of us, but can be shelled out as soon as you engage their flank...

— Maj. Gen. John Pope, August 29, 4:30pm

At 4:30 pm, Pope, frustrated that no attack was occurring on Jackson's right flank and still unaware of Longstreet's presence, despite numerous reports of a large Confederate force forming west of his position, sent an explicit order to attack by way of his nephew. But his nephew became lost and was unable to deliver the message until 6:30 pm. Even had the message been on time, it was impossible for Porter to both move forward and attack Jackson's right flank and maintain contact with Brigadier General John F. Reynolds's division of McDowell's corps. To attack would place the V Corps on one side of Longstreet's Corps and Reynolds on the other. Porter again ignored Pope's orders and Pope again assumed Porter was attacking and launched a costly attack on Jackson's left flank. During the attack, McDowell finally delivered Buford's report to Pope, who then had to acknowledge that Longstreet was on the battlefield. When the attack failed, Pope sent explicit orders to Porter to march his corps to the main battlefield and meet with him personally. Porter did so, but sent one of his brigades to Centreville.

That night Pope convened his generals and they argued about the Confederates' intentions. Pope insisted that Longstreet had arrived only to help cover Jackson's retreat. Porter maintained that Jackson was still well-entrenched and determined to fight, but McDowell claimed to be unable to find evidence that Jackson's corps was holding position. Pope ordered another large-scale assault on Jackson the next day, with Porter's corps leading the attack.

On the morning of August 30, Porter organized his corps for the assault, but it took them two hours to organize and begin advancing. Some of Porter's men had to cross 600 yards of open pasture land, the final 150 yards of which were steeply uphill, to attack a strong position behind the unfinished railroad; others had only 300 yards to traverse, but were required to perform a complex right wheel maneuver under fire to hit the Confederate position squarely in its front. They experienced devastating fire from Confederate batteries and then withering volleys from the infantrymen in the line. Nevertheless, they were able to break the Confederate line, but Confederate reinforcements drove them back. In what was arguably the most famous incident of the battle, some Confederate brigades fired so much that they ran out of ammunition and resorted to throwing large rocks. To support Jackson's exhausted defense, Longstreet's artillery added to the barrage against Union reinforcements attempting to move in, cutting them to pieces.

As the V Corps fell back, Longstreet launched a counterattack, sweeping Pope's whole army back and threatening to rout it. A bold defensive by several brigades on Chinn Ridge, then of Henry Hill, was all that enabled the Union to stabilize the situation and retreat from Manassas in an orderly fashion.

== Court-martial ==
After the battle, Pope was relieved of command and his corps were merged into McClellan's Army of the Potomac. Pope was sent to Minnesota to command U.S. forces in the Dakota War of 1862, but kept up a correspondence with his allies in Washington. McClellan, meanwhile, led his army to a victory over the Army of Northern Virginia at the Battle of Antietam, but failed to rout them, in part because he was too nervous to commit Porter's V Corps to battle after the general is said to have warned him, "Remember, General, I command the last reserve of the last Army of the Republic." In the weeks following the battle, McClellan failed to take any decisive action and Lee's army slipped back into Virginia to regroup and fight again. On November 5, McClellan was ordered to hand over his command to Burnside. Three weeks later, on November 25, without the protection of his friend as commander of the army, Porter was arrested and relieved of command.

=== Charges ===
Porter was charged with two violations of the Articles of War for his actions during the Second Battle of Bull Run, Article IX, disobeying a lawful order, and Article LII, misbehavior in front of the enemy. Both charges contained specifications, examples when Porter allegedly committed the offense. The two charges were serious and a conviction could result in anything from expulsion from the army to execution. Due to the rules of courts-martial, charges were filed not by Pope himself, but by Brigadier General B.S. Roberts, the Inspector-General of the Army of Virginia.

==== First charge: disobeying a lawful order ====
- Specification 1: disobeying Pope's order on the night of August 27 to move to Bristoe Station at 1:00 am
- Specification 2: disobeying Pope's order on the morning of August 29 to move the V Corps towards Gainesville
- Specification 3: disobeying Pope's order on the afternoon of August 29 to attack Jackson's right flank
- Specification 4: disobeying Pope's further order on the evening of August 29 to commence an attack on Jackson's right flank immediately
- Specification 5: sending one brigade to Centreville on the night of August 29, in disobedience of Pope's orders to bring his entire corps to the battlefield

==== Second charge: misbehavior in front of the enemy ====
- Specification 1: not engaging, nor making any effort to engage, Jackson's right flank as ordered on the afternoon of August 29, but instead falling back
- Specification 2: falling back on August 29, while in earshot of the battle and knowing his corps was needed, without even attempting to ascertain the strength of the enemy
- Specification 3: falling back on August 29, while aware that Pope's attacks were failing, and thereby aiding in the defeat of a Union army and placing in jeopardy the capital city
- Specification 4: moving slowly to attack on August 30, and, when the attack had commenced, not making a full effort and not attempting to rally his troops or otherwise inspire them to break through the enemy line

In the first charge, Pope – through his inspector general – was trying to prove that Porter's failure to follow his orders resulted in the situation which gave the Confederates the upper hand on the battlefield. Of particular importance to Pope was the assertion that if Porter had moved at 1:00 am as ordered, Longstreet would have been unable to take up the close position on Jackson's right flank and then the Confederates behind the unfinished railroad grade might have been dislodged. This also helped draw attention away from Pope's failure to acknowledge the reality of Longstreet's corps arrival to the battlefield, though the general would continue to deny that the second Confederate corps had arrived until the evening of August 29.

In the second, Pope accused Porter of cowardice at best, open treason at worst. Porter pleaded "not guilty" to all charges.

=== Court ===
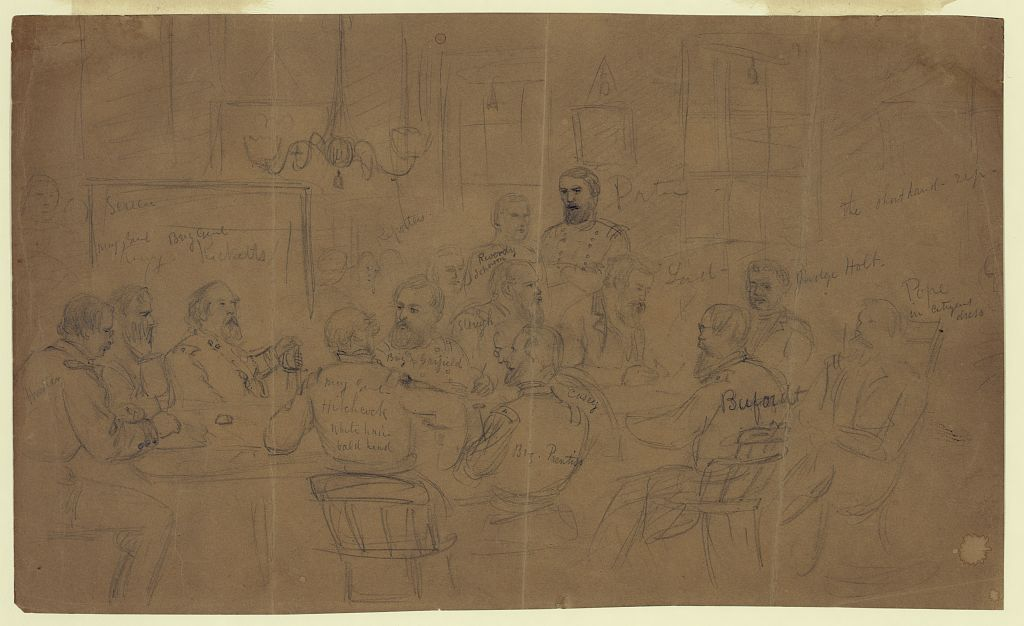
The court-martial of Fitz John Porter sketched by Alfred Waud

The trial was prosecuted by the United States Army Judge Advocate General Colonel Joseph Holt. Secretary of War Edwin Stanton – a McClellan opponent – is said to have picked the make-up of the court personally.

- Major General David Hunter, President of the court, and a veteran of the First Battle of Bull Run and close political ally of Lincoln
- Major General E.A. Hitchcock, the former chairman of the War Board, which advised Lincoln and Stanton on war matters during the time between McClellan and Halleck's stints as General-in-Chief
- Brigadier General Rufus King, divisional commander in McDowell's corps who was absent from the battle due to a bout of epilepsy and Lincoln's former emissary to Rome
- Brigadier General Benjamin Prentiss, a renowned general who had served with Ulysses S. Grant, but had just been released from Confederate hands in a prisoner exchange
- Brigadier General James Ricketts, another of McDowell's divisional commanders, who had attempted to hold Longstreet's corps at Thoroughfare Gap
- Brigadier General Silas Casey, a career general and author of a several-volume, influential manual on infantry tactics that had just been published
- Brigadier General James A. Garfield, a hero of the Battle of Shiloh who had returned east due to poor health, and just been elected to the House of Representatives from Ohio
- Brigadier General Napoleon Bonaparte Buford, the half-brother of John Buford, the cavalry officer whose report on Longstreet's movement McDowell did not forward to Pope
- Brigadier General John P. Slough, the military governor of the City of Alexandria

For his defense, Porter chose Reverdy Johnson, former Attorney General for Zachary Taylor. Johnson was a contentious figure in the north. He was a staunchly conservative Democrat who had supported Stephen Douglas against Lincoln and who had argued on behalf of the slave-owning defendant in the infamous Dred Scott case. But Johnson was known to be personally opposed to slavery and had been instrumental in ensuring Maryland remained in the Union.

=== Trial ===
Hunter determined that the trial should be open to the public and the newspapers and daily magazines all rushed to get reporters and artists to Washington. In the wake of the tumultuous election loss for Republicans, most of the country viewed the trial through partisan, political eyes. Newspapers, including The New York Times, dutifully recorded and printed the testimony, often accentuating the most outrageous aspects of it. It was not a difficult task. The prosecution found ready testimony from other officers of Pope's army that sought to clear their own names after the disaster of Manassas. McDowell, in the midst of answering to his own court of inquiry regarding actions during the battle that had led to his virtual banishment from the army, was an eager cooperator in pinning much of the blame for the loss on Porter. Even more damaging than the testimony of prominent Republican generals was that the only maps used during the trial were supplied by Pope and substantiated his version of the time-line for the positioning of Longstreet's corps.

The defense argued that Pope was incompetent, and that Porter's actions had saved the army from an even greater defeat. Sykes and Morell testified on behalf of their former commander that movement on the night of August 27 was not only impractical, but reckless. Even Burnside took a leave from his command to testify on behalf of Porter in reference to the telegrams criticizing Pope he had received, though the newest commander of the Army of the Potomac had a specific interest in drawing attention away from his own recent loss at the Battle of Fredericksburg. Other prominent friends of Porter, including McClellan, who was now openly decrying Lincoln and making plans to enter into Democratic Party politics, testified that the vast majority of the army agreed with Porter's assessments of Pope's poor leadership expressed in the telegrams.

Traitor to my country! When did treason so peril and labor to rescue it from destruction?... If the charge had not assumed the solemn form that has been given to it, it would be received everywhere where my whole conduct is known, as ludicrous, false, or the creation of a morbid or distempered brain.

— Maj. Gen. Fitz John Porter

Ultimately, both sides turned the case into one of character. For the prosecution, Porter was an arrogant disciple of an arrogant commander (McClellan), who was more interested in his own career than in the good of his country. Much was made of his previous relationship with Lee at West Point and of his role as McClellan's protégé, just as McClellan had been the protégé of then-Secretary of War Jefferson Davis. Porter had had more affection for these connections and so let his contempt for Pope override obedience to his superior and handed victory to the Confederates.

To the defense, Porter was an American hero that had been wronged by a petty, incompetent former commander who happened to be friends with the President. His record of service before the war, and especially his successes during the Peninsula Campaign, were cited as evidence for his loyalty.

The Court held their vote in secret, but word of it leaked out to the press. Porter first heard the results when a New York Times correspondent asked him for a comment. He was found guilty of both charges, though not guilty of the fourth and fifth specifications of the first charge, and the implication that he had retreated in the first specification of the second charge was stricken. On January 21, the court ordered Fitz John Porter cashiered, or dismissed from the army for disciplinary reasons, and "forever disqualified from holding any office of trust or profit under the Government of the United States."

== Porter attempts to clear his name ==
The conviction, rather than ending the controversy, served only to extend it. Coupled with the disastrous loss at Fredericksburg, the near mutiny of Burnside's officers after the Mud March, and the resurgence of the Democratic Party, which was increasingly calling for negotiated settlement, the trial severely unsettled the public perception of competence in the army and administration. The New York Times even went so far as to question the loyalty-inspiring capabilities of West Point as an institute, though it took the conviction as proof that the vast majority of West Pointers were loyal, unlike Porter.

Porter immediately set about attempting to overturn the conviction. He began by extensively surveying and mapping the battleground to develop a comprehensive map of every tree, bush, and hill in the vicinity of his corps. Then he meticulously transcribed testimony of anyone he could get to cooperate in order to record exact positions during the battle. With the help of his friends, especially the increasingly powerful McClellan, he began petitioning famous figures to write letters on his behalf. They also used their influence to try to get state and local lawmakers to pass resolutions condemning the U.S. government for dismissing Porter.

He also tried to draw attention to the make-up of the court and argued that a Republican administration had fixed a court to rule against him in order to protect its own interests. Not long after he had testified as an administration witness against Porter, McDowell's court of inquiry exonerated him of wrongdoing at the Second Battle of Bull Run and recommended he be returned to command. Several of the other officers on the court received promotions shortly after the trial.

But Porter's actions were met with furious counter-actions. Stanton repeatedly blocked any attempt by the government to re-investigate the matter and saw to it that officers who spoke out in support of Porter were punished. In the Republican press especially, Porter was savaged as a traitor who had escaped the punishment he had deserved. The New York Times opined that not only was Porter's crusade to overturn his conviction immoral in that it encouraged dissent in the ranks, but that the general himself ought to have been executed.

When the war ended, Porter wrote to both Lee and Longstreet asking for their assistance in the matter and also petitioned to be allowed access to captured papers of the Confederacy. Both Lee and Longstreet replied, Longstreet in great detail, and Porter used the evidence to garner supporters to send petitions to President Andrew Johnson asking for a new trial. Resolutions demanding his case be reopened and equally fierce denunciations of those resolution had swirled on the local and national level, barely slowed since January 1863, but Porter supporters – now including such famous generals as Ulysses S. Grant, William Tecumseh Sherman, and George H. Thomas, which contributed greatly to their rapid decline in popularity with their own party – were finally gaining enough headway to reexamine the issue.

However, the President had no power to hold a new trial and, despite his support for Porter, during Grant's term he was unwilling to revisit the decision in any fashion, perhaps to appease Republican supporters. Finally, in 1878, President Rutherford B. Hayes commissioned a board under Major General John Schofield, who had briefly replaced Stanton as Secretary of War after Johnson forced him out, to investigate.

== Schofield Commission ==
Schofield was joined by Brigadier General Alfred Terry, in between stints commanding U.S. forces in the Dakota Territory, and Colonel (since wartime brevets had reverted to regular army ranks) George W. Getty, who had been part of Burnside's corps that had not made it in time to the battlefield near Manassas in August 1862. They reviewed the extensive evidence compiled by Porter during the intervening years and conducted interviews of their own with principals from both sides of the fighting on the day of the battle.

On March 19, 1879, the commission issued a report to President Hayes recommending that "justice requires at [the President's] hands such action as may be necessary to annul and set aside the findings and sentence of the court-martial in the case of Maj. Gen. Fitz John Porter, and to restore him to the positions of which that sentence deprived him – such restoration to take effect from the date of his dismissal from the service." The report found Porter guilty of no wrongdoing during the course of action on August 29, 1862, and, in fact, credited him with saving the Union Army from an even greater defeat, declaring:

What General Porter actually did do, although his situation was by no means free from embarrassment and anxiety at the time, now seems to have been only the simple, necessary action which an intelligent soldier had no choice but to take. It is not possible that any court-martial could have condemned such conduct if it had been correctly understood. On the contrary, that conduct was obedient, subordinate, faithful, and judicious. It saved the Union army from disaster on the 29th of August.

Though the report – a detailed narrative of the entire events of the battle from a third-person perspective of Porter – focused on absolving Porter of guilt for disobedience to orders or misbehavior in the face of the enemy, it also attributed much of the confusion of the situation and overall loss of the battle to Pope and McDowell. Pope is repeatedly described as out of touch with the situation and unaware of troop positions as he issued orders. Accordingly, Porter had to decide mid-battle whether to be "true" to a very confused commander. Two credible witnesses testified that, during the time of his original court martial, Porter said privately that he had not been "true to Pope." The commission rested its decision on other evidence. Focusing specifically on the 4:30 order to attack Jackson's right flank, the commission determined that not only had Pope's nephew arrived much later than he had claimed in the court-martial, rendering the order obsolete, but that if he had arrived promptly Porter would still not have been able to carry out an attack as "such an attack, under such circumstances, would have been not only a great blunder, but, on the part of an intelligent officer, it would have been a great crime."

The harshest criticism was saved for McDowell, who was repeatedly described as indecisive, uncommunicative, and inept. Under the Articles of War, McDowell should have taken command of both his and Porter's corps, as the senior officer, either on his own initiative when determining Longstreet's arrival or upon the arrival of the "Joint Order." Instead, he hesitated, deferred, and then ultimately split the command, leaving Porter with 9,000 men to face Longstreet's corps of at least 20,000. The report stated that McDowell at best drastically misunderstood the situation and his own responsibilities when testifying, at worst perjured himself. After the issuance of the report, McDowell's reputation suffered greatly.

While lauding his actions, Schofield and his fellow justices found fault with Porter's behavior before the battle. They attributed some of the negative feelings he had expressed to the confusion of command from Washington, since it was unclear if Pope's army was intended to unite to McClellan's, McClellan's to Pope's, or both together, with Halleck himself arriving to take command. The report declared that the telegrams to Burnside and other negative statements by Porter were beyond the scope of the investigation and only tangential to the events of the battle, but "that the indiscreet and unkind terms in which General Porter expressed his distrust of the capacity of his superior commander cannot be defended. And to that indiscretion was due, in very great measure, the misinterpretation of both his motives and his conduct and his consequent condemnation."

Despite the commission's findings, political opposition still prevented Porter from obtaining reinstatement. Hayes, a Republican, did not have the political support to overcome his own party's opposition to a pardon. Porter was still seen by the Radical Republicans as a traitor and his success in obtaining national figures to speak on his behalf was seen as connected to a dangerous resurgence of the Democrats in national politics. And when Hayes left office, he was succeeded by James A. Garfield, who had voted to convict Porter as part of the court. When, on May 6, 1882, President Chester A. Arthur – who succeeded Garfield after his assassination – commuted Porter's sentence by restoring his rights to hold public office, it was seen by The New York Times as a collapse to pressure from powerful interests, and special note was made that the President had not agreed or disagreed with the Schofield Commission in his order.

Much partisan wrangling erupted in both houses of Congress. The Radical Republicans were organized primarily by Senator John A. Logan, one of Grant's top generals during the Vicksburg campaign, and focused on the illegality of the Schofield Commission and the perceived traitorous nature of Porter. Despite their vocal and fierce counterattack and after a veto of a bill to restore Porter to the army by President Arthur in 1884, a bill passed the Congress and was signed by President Cleveland in 1886 to restore Porter to his regular army rank of colonel, but with no compensation for back pay missed. Two days later, vindicated, Porter retired from the army.

== Statue ==
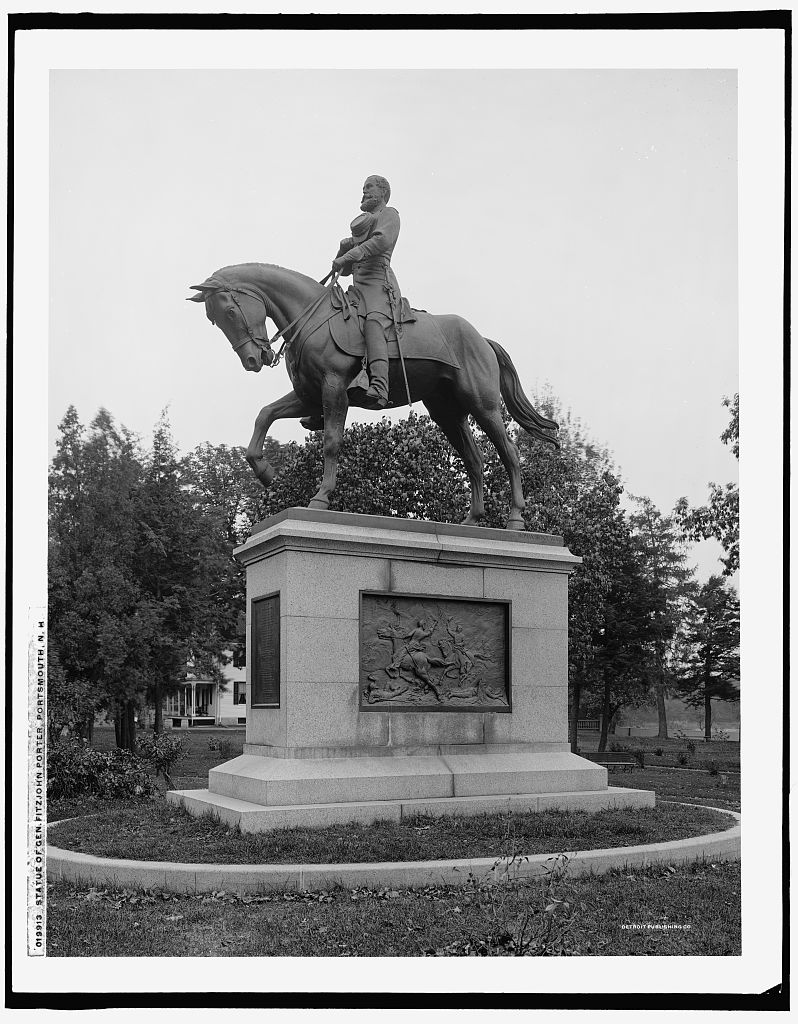
Statue of Fitz John Porter, Portsmouth, N.H.

Once on his death bed, General Porter began working with sculptor James E. Kelly to create a monument that reflected how he viewed his legacy. The statue stands today, at Haven Park in Portsmouth, New Hampshire. It is graced by metal tablets at the base, which attempt to convey the error of Porter's court-martial.

== Today ==
Though the obsessive, partisan animosity that gripped much of the country during the trial and subsequent attempts to overturn the verdict have been almost entirely forgotten, the effect of the meticulous casework undertaken by Porter and his allies can be seen at Manassas National Battlefield Park, the site of the Second Battle of Bull Run. When construction of the Steven F. Udvar-Hazy Center, an annex to the Smithsonian Institution's National Air and Space Museum, disturbed wetlands on the site, the Smithsonian and its funders paid to restore portions of the Battlefield Park that had been disrupted by construction during the 1980s by John T. "Til" Hazel to their 1862 conditions. Using Porter's extremely detailed maps, they were able to restore the grounds to within one inch of their previous form and replant to create the most historically accurate battlefield in the park system.

Porter's papers are available through the Library of Congress.

== Bibliography ==
- Anders, Curt, Injustice on Trial: Second Bull Run, General Fitz John Porter's Court Martial, and the Schofield Board Investigation that Restored His Good Name. Guild Press Emis Publishing, LP, 2003, ISBN 1-57860-110-X.
- Donovan, Kevin, "The Court-Martial of Fitz-John Porter," Columbiad 2 (Winter 1999): 73–97.
- Esposito, Vincent J. (1959). West Point Atlas of American Wars. Vol. 1: 1689–1900 (1st ed.). New York: Frederick A. Praeger Publishers. OCLC 5890637.
- Soini, Wayne, Porter's Secret. Jetty House, 2011, ISBN 0-9828236-8-1.
- United States War Department, The War of the Rebellion: a Compilation of Official Records from the Union and Confederate Armies, Government Printing Office, 1880–1901.

=== Further reading ===
- Porter, Fitz-John; Grant, Ulysses S. (1869). Appeal to the President of the United States for a re-examination of the proceedings of the general court martial in his case. Morristown, N.J.
- Wheeler, Joseph (1883). Fitz-John Porter. Washington, Government Printing Office.
- United States. War Dept; United States. Army (1879). In the matter of Fitz-John Porter. Philadelphia, Allen, Lane & Scott, printers.
- Bullitt, John Christian (1879). Argument of John C. Bullitt, counsel for the petitioner, Fitz John Porter, before the advisory board of officers at West Point. Philadelphia : Allen, Lane & Scott.
- Grant, Ulysses (1884). General Grant's unpublished correspondence in the case of Gen. Fitz-John Porter. unpublished.
- Gardiner, Asa Bird (1878). Opening argument for the United States in rebuttal in the case of Fitz-John Porter, before the Advisory board of officers. Washington, Government Printing Office.
