= John W. Stiles =

American colonel and inventor

John Wesley Stiles
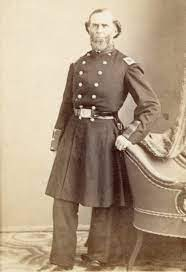
- Born: January 31, 1811; New York City, New York, US
- Died: September 15, 1885 (aged 74); New York City, New York, US
- Burial place: Green-Wood Cemetery, Brooklyn, New York, US
- Spouse: Elizabeth Fisher Taylor (m. 1836–1878)
- Military career
- Allegiance: United States (Union)
- Branch: United States Army (Union Army)
- Service years: 1861 – 1863
- Rank: Colonel
- Commands: 83rd New York Infantry Regiment
- Conflicts: American Civil War: Northern Virginia campaign; Battle of Cedar Mountain; First Battle of Rappahannock Station; Second Battle of Bull Run; Battle of Chantilly; Maryland campaign; Battle of Harpers Ferry; Battle of South Mountain; Battle of Antietam

John Wesley Stiles (1811–1885) was an American colonel and inventor who commanded the 83rd New York Infantry Regiment throughout the early years of the American Civil War as well as commander of the 3rd Brigade of James B. Ricketts' Second Division of the III Corps as well as being a renowned inventor at the American Institute of the City of New York.

== Biography ==
=== Early years ===
John was born at New York City on January 31, 1811, as the son of Oratha Stiles and Elizabeth Billings. During his early years, Stiles would be educated at New York City as well as primarily work in the ship chandlery business at New York City. Stiles married Elizabeth Fisher Taylor on 1836 and had a total of 9 children with her. He also formed a partnership with Marshall O. Roberts before setting out on his own business. On 1858, he reportedly switched industries to the wood industry as he was a dealer for dye woods.

=== American Civil War ===
Stiles registered in the 9th New York state Militia as its colonel on May 16, 1861, and was later commissioned to be assigned as the main colonel of the 83rd New York Infantry Regiment after relieving the 7th Infantry Regiment. During his service with the 83rd New York, Stiles would participate at the Battle of Harpers Ferry, the Battle of Cedar Mountain, the First Battle of Rappahannock Station and the Battle of Thoroughfare Gap. He was later appointed as commander of the 3rd brigade of Nathaniel P. Banks and in 1862, was assigned to be the commander of the 3rd Brigade of James B. Ricketts' Second Division of the III Corps of the Army of Virginia. He then lead the 3rd Brigade into the Second Battle of Bull Run, the Battle of Chantilly, the Battle of South Mountain and the Battle of Antietam. After that however, he was discharged from service in January 1863 due to injuries. He was then replaced by Lt. Col Hendrickson.

== Post-war life ==
Stiles returned to New York City with his health in shambles and could no longer continue being a ship chandler but with his new interest in mechanics made him become an inventor and managed to win the gold medal at the American Institute of the City of New York in 1884. One of his daughters stated:

If my father had made science the business of his life, there would have been more heard of him than will now be the case; he was a real student all his life.

Stiles died on September 15, 1885, and was buried at Green-Wood Cemetery.
