= Julius A. De Lagnel =

Julius Adolphus De Lagnel
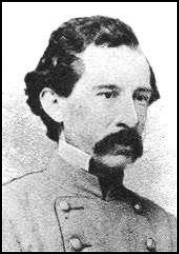
- Born: July 24, 1827; Newark, New Jersey
- Died: June 3, 1912 (aged 84); Washington, D.C.
- Burial place: Alexandria, Virginia
- Military career
- Allegiance: United States of America; Confederate States of America
- Branch: United States Army; Confederate States Army
- Service years: 1847–1861 (USA); 1861–1865 (CSA)
- Rank: First Lieutenant (USA); Lieutenant Colonel (CSA); Brigadier general (CSA)
- Unit: 2nd United States Artillery
- Commands: Inspector of Arsenals
- Conflicts: American Civil War: Battle of Rich Mountain
- Other work: Pacific steamship service.

Julius Adolphus De Lagnel (July 24, 1827 – June 3, 1912), was a Confederate States Army officer, who was appointed and confirmed as a brigadier general, during the American Civil War, but who declined the appointment. He was second in command to Brigadier General Josiah Gorgas in the Confederate Ordnance Bureau and at times was an inspector of arsenals. Before the war, he served in the United States Army from March 8, 1847, until May 17, 1861. After the war, he was engaged in Pacific steamship service.

== Early life ==
Julius Adolphus De Lagnel was born on July 24, 1827, in Newark, New Jersey. His parents were Julius Adolphus, Sr., (1798–1840) and Harriet (née Sanford) De Lagnel; his father was a United States Military Academy graduate (class of 1821) who was an ordnance officer and served in Florida during the Second Seminole Wars.

De Lagnel was commissioned directly into the U.S. Army in 1847 as a second lieutenant of artillery without having attended the United States Military Academy or a military college. He was promoted to first lieutenant on January 26, 1849. He resigned on May 17, 1861, and moved to his "adopted" state of Virginia to join the Confederate States Army.

== American Civil War ==
After his resignation from the U.S. Army, Julius A. De Lagnel was appointed a captain of artillery in the Regular Army of the Confederate States. In June 1861, he was assigned as chief of artillery to Brigadier General Robert S. Garnett, commander of the Army of the Northwest. Garnett had been sent to reorganize the Confederate force in the western counties of Virginia after their rout at the Battle of Philippi and to hold the area for the Confederacy. De Lagnel defended the crest of Rich Mountain with a force of four companies and one gun during the Battle of Rich Mountain, July 11, 1861. The main Confederate force did not immediately know that De Lagnel's men were under attack by a superior force commanded by Brigadier General William S. Rosecrans. De Lagnel's force eventually was overwhelmed. After De Lagnel used the sole artillery piece to fight by himself for a period of time, he was wounded and hid in a thicket in an effort to escape from the Union troops. He first escaped from the battlefield to a mountaineer's cabin. After two days of recuperation, he tried to return to Confederate lines disguised as a herder. Union troops detected, identified and captured him near Laurel Hill, Virginia, on July 13, 1861. On December 18, 1861, De Lagnel was exchanged for Union Brigadier General James B. Ricketts.

De Lagnel was appointed and confirmed as a Confederate brigadier general to rank from April 12, 1862, but on July 31, 1862, he declined the commission. Historian Stewart Sifakis says the reason for De Lagnel's action is unknown. De Lagnel then served as major of artillery in the 20th Battalion of Virginia Artillery in the Army of Northern Virginia, in June and July 1862.

In July 1862, De Lagnel was appointed lieutenant colonel of ordnance. He served as second in command of the Confederate Ordnance Bureau under Brigadier General Josiah Gorgas. He also commanded the Fayetteville, North Carolina, arsenal in July 1862 – 1863. In addition to his ordnance duties, De Lagnel also acted as inspector of arsenals. He was paroled at Greensboro, North Carolina, May 1, 1865.

== Aftermath ==
After the Civil War, De Lagnel was engaged in Pacific steamship service for many years. He died on June 3, 1912, at Washington, D.C. Julius Adolph De Lagnel was buried in the cemetery of St. Paul's Episcopal Church, Alexandria, Virginia.

== See also ==
- List of American Civil War generals (Confederate)
