= Battle of Rich Mountain =

Battle of the American Civil War

- Part of the American Civil War
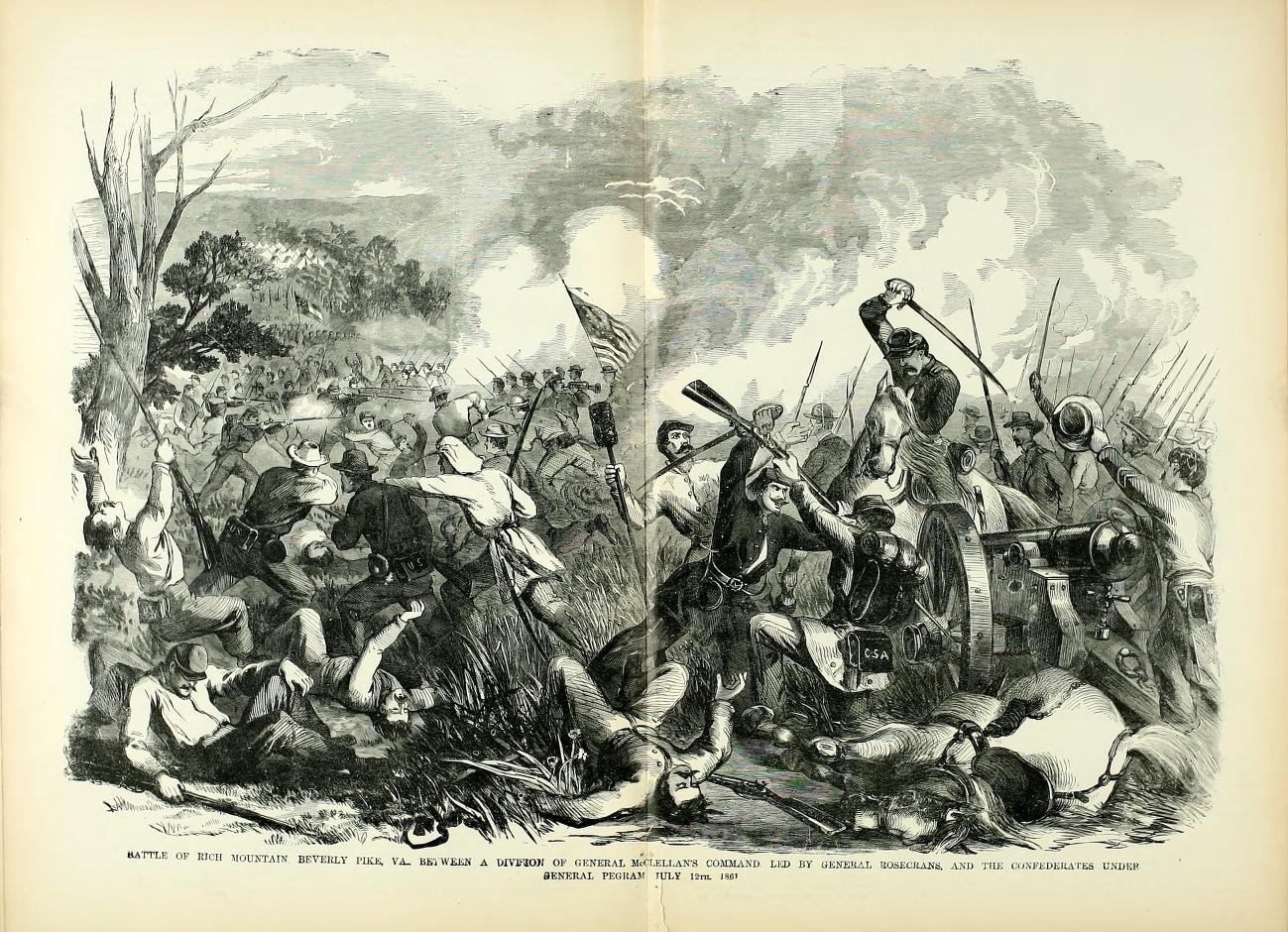
Date	July 11, 1861
Location	Randolph County, Virginia (now West Virginia) 38°51′58″N 79°56′02″W
Result	Union victory

Belligerents
United States (Union)	(Confederate States of America) CSA (Confederacy)

Commanders and leaders
(United States) George B. McClellan (United States) William S. Rosecrans	(Confederate States of America) John Pegram (surrendered)

Strength
2,000	1,300

Casualties and losses
74	88 555 including General Pegram surrendered next day

The Battle of Rich Mountain took place on July 11, 1861, in Randolph County, Virginia (now West Virginia) as part of the Operations in Western Virginia Campaign during the American Civil War.

== Background ==
Maj. Gen. George B. McClellan assumed command of Union forces in western Virginia in June 1861. On June 27, he moved his divisions from Clarksburg south against Lt. Col. John Pegram's Confederates, reaching the vicinity of Rich Mountain on July 9. Meanwhile, Brig. Gen. Thomas A. Morris's Union brigade marched from Philippi to confront Brig. Gen. Robert S. Garnett's command at Laurel Hill. On July 10–11, Brig. Gen. William Rosecrans led a reinforced brigade by a mountain path to seize the Staunton-Parkersburg Turnpike in Pegram's rear.

== Battle ==
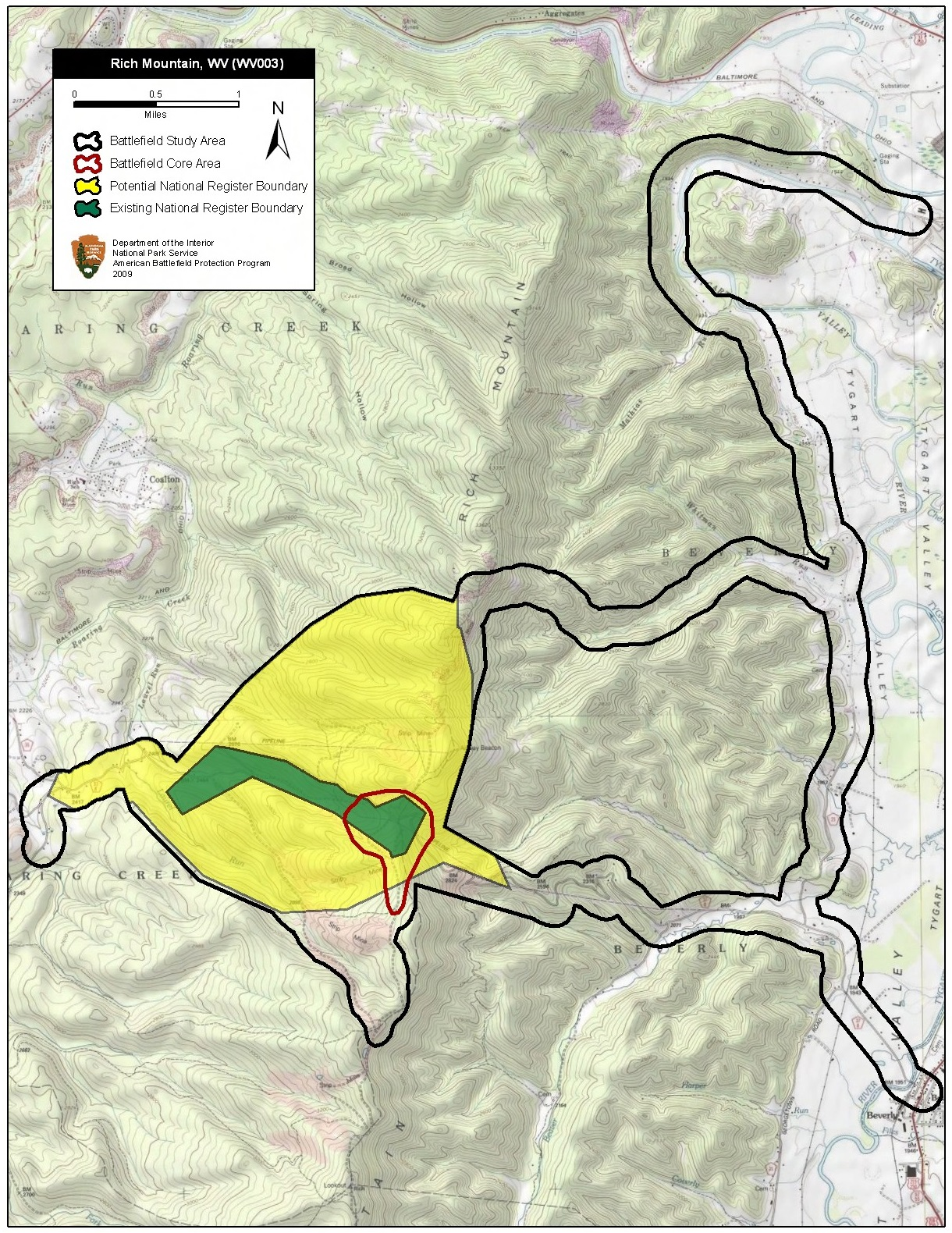
Map of Rich Mountain Battlefield core and study areas by the American Battlefield Protection Program

=== Laurel Mountain ===
Union forces under Thomas A. Morris, totaling approximately 4000 troops, beset Confederates under General Garnett at Laurel Mountain starting July 7. After less than a week of skirmishing Morris’ force came to a standoff against Garnett’s Confederate force on Laurel Hill. Occasional sniper and artillery fire plagued both sides amidst inclement weather. Stiff resistance convinced Morris he faced the main Confederate force. On July 11, Garnett learned of the Union flanking maneuver at Rich Mountain and decided to withdraw from Laurel Mountain. The 44th Virginia Infantry was ordered to hold the Beverly Road by engaging Federals to give the appearance of an attack. With Gen. William Rosecrans’ Union brigade approaching from the South, Garnett abandoned the Beverly Road and withdrew toward Corrick’s Ford on the Cheat River, where he was killed.

=== Rich Mountain ===
Union forces under the direct command of General McClellan greatly outnumbered Pegram’s Confederates on Rich Mountain. Nevertheless, the Confederates held a strong position and inexperienced soldiers in his own command convinced McClellan to precede any action with an artillery duel. A local boy named David Hart entered Gen. William Rosecrans’ Union camp and said he knew a way around to the rear of the Confederate lines, for which he was offered one hundred dollars in gold. McClellan agreed to let Hart lead Rosecrans’ brigade of 1,900 men through the woods. The route took roughly 10 hours through wet, rough terrain which forced Rosecrans to leave his artillery behind. During this time, Col. Pegram was able to learn from a captured sergeant of the Union flanking movement. Pegram incorrectly assumed the attack was coming from the north and positioned a lone 16-pound artillery piece with most of his command in defense. Captain Julius A. De Lagnel, Garnett’s chief of artillery, assumed command of this force around David Hart’s family farm. At 2:30pm Rosecrans’ force appeared at the pass on Rich Mountain and attacked. Confederates quickly redeployed their artillery piece and twice repulsed Union skirmishers from behind crude breastworks. Assuming they had defeated the enemy, Pegram’s men began cheering. The cheering was enough to also convince McClellan that Rosecrans had been defeated. However, most of the Union soldiers were well concealed behind trees and logs. Rosecrans counterattacked and routed the Confederates in his front, wounding De Lagnel. McClellan shelled the Rebel position, but did not make the expected assault. Half the Confederates escaped to Beverly and on over the Shawnee Trail. Pegram and the others (including the "Sydney Boys", a regiment formed from the students of Hampden-Sydney College) attempted to make their way north to link up with Garnett. Pegram’s force was too exhausted to make it and 555 men surrendered on July 12.

== Aftermath ==
Hearing of Pegram's defeat, Garnett abandoned Laurel Mountain in great disorder. The Federals pursued, and, during fighting at Corrick's Ford on July 13, Garnett was killed; he was the first general officer to be killed in the war. On July 22, McClellan was ordered to Washington, and Rosecrans assumed command of Union forces in western Virginia. The Union victory at Rich Mountain was met with great celebration in the north, and was instrumental in propelling McClellan to command of the Army of the Potomac. After the victory at Rich Mountain and failure of Morris to pursue the Confederate troops at Laurel Mountain fast enough to catch them before crossing Shavers' fork, McClellan severely criticized Morris in his report to Washington.

== Preservation ==
The battlefield and Camp Garnett today are owned and protected by the Rich Mountain Battlefield Foundation. The Civil War Trust (a division of the American Battlefield Trust) and its partners, including the foundation, have acquired and preserved 57 acres (0.23 km^{2}) of the battlefield. The site is listed on the National Register of Historic Places.

== See also ==
- West Virginia in the American Civil War

== Gallery ==
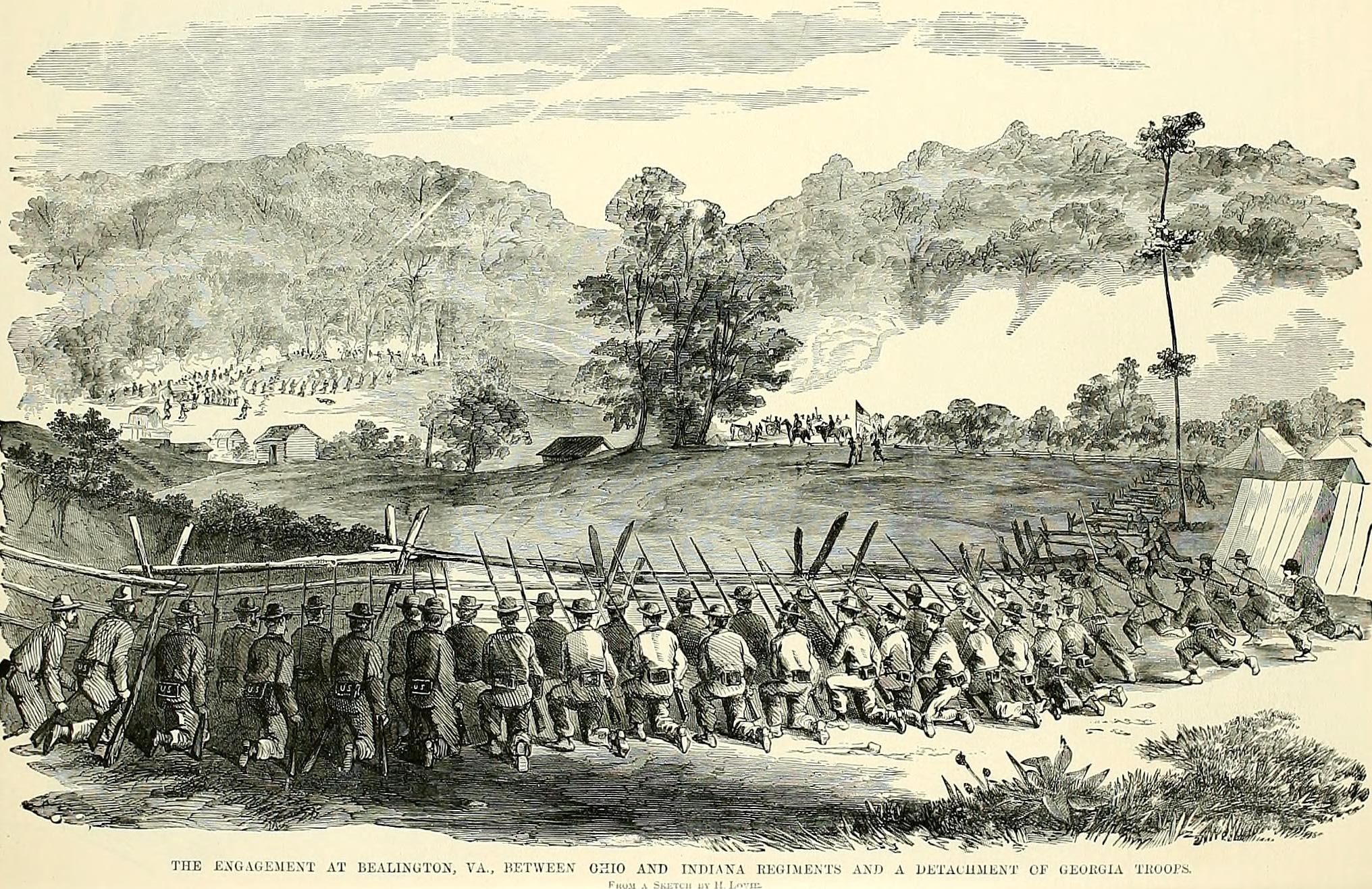
Battle at Laurel Mountain (several kilometers away from Rich Mountain) fought concurrently. Confederates on Laurel Mountain retreated in great disorder after hearing of the defeat of Confederate forces on Rich Mountain.

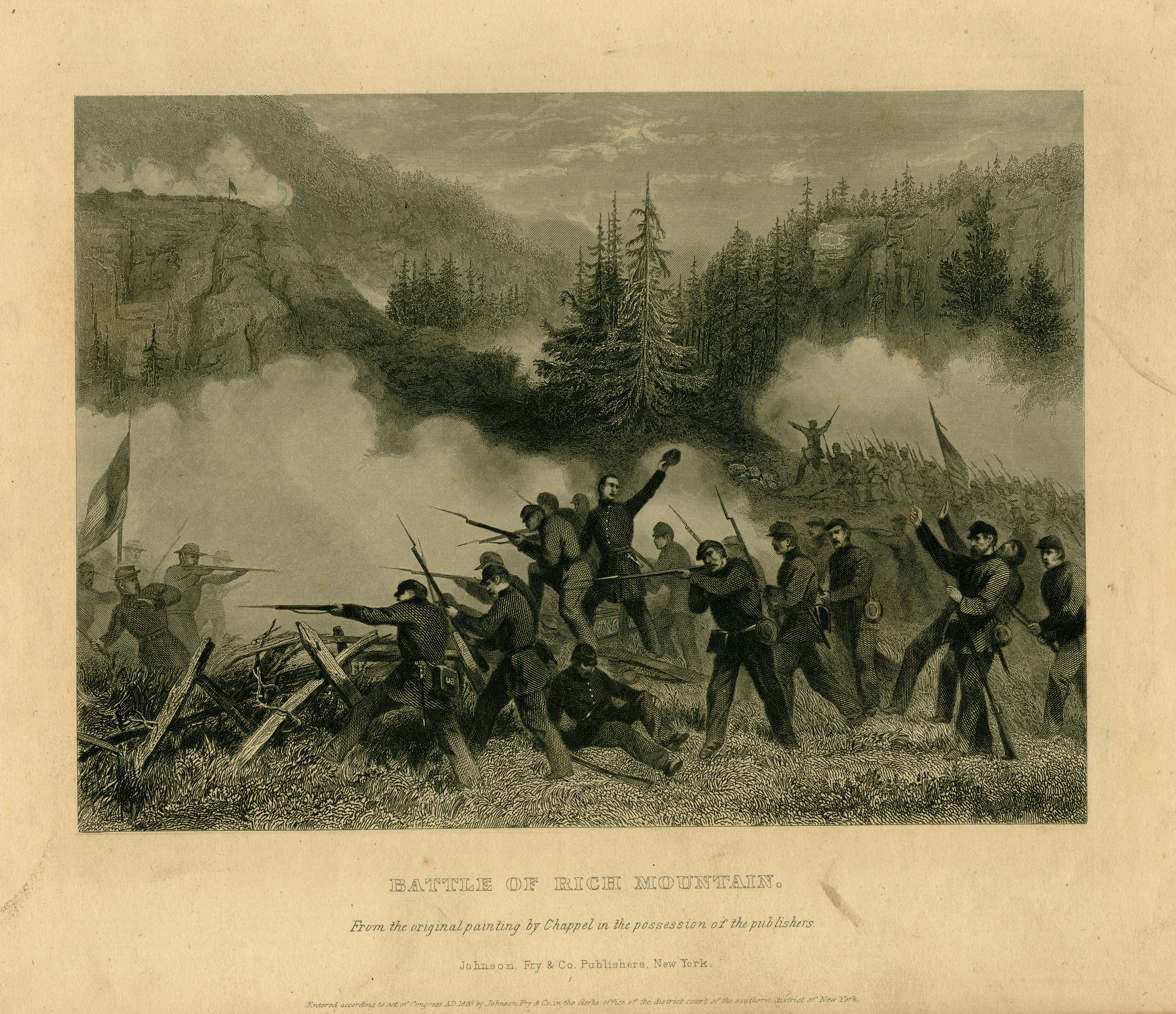

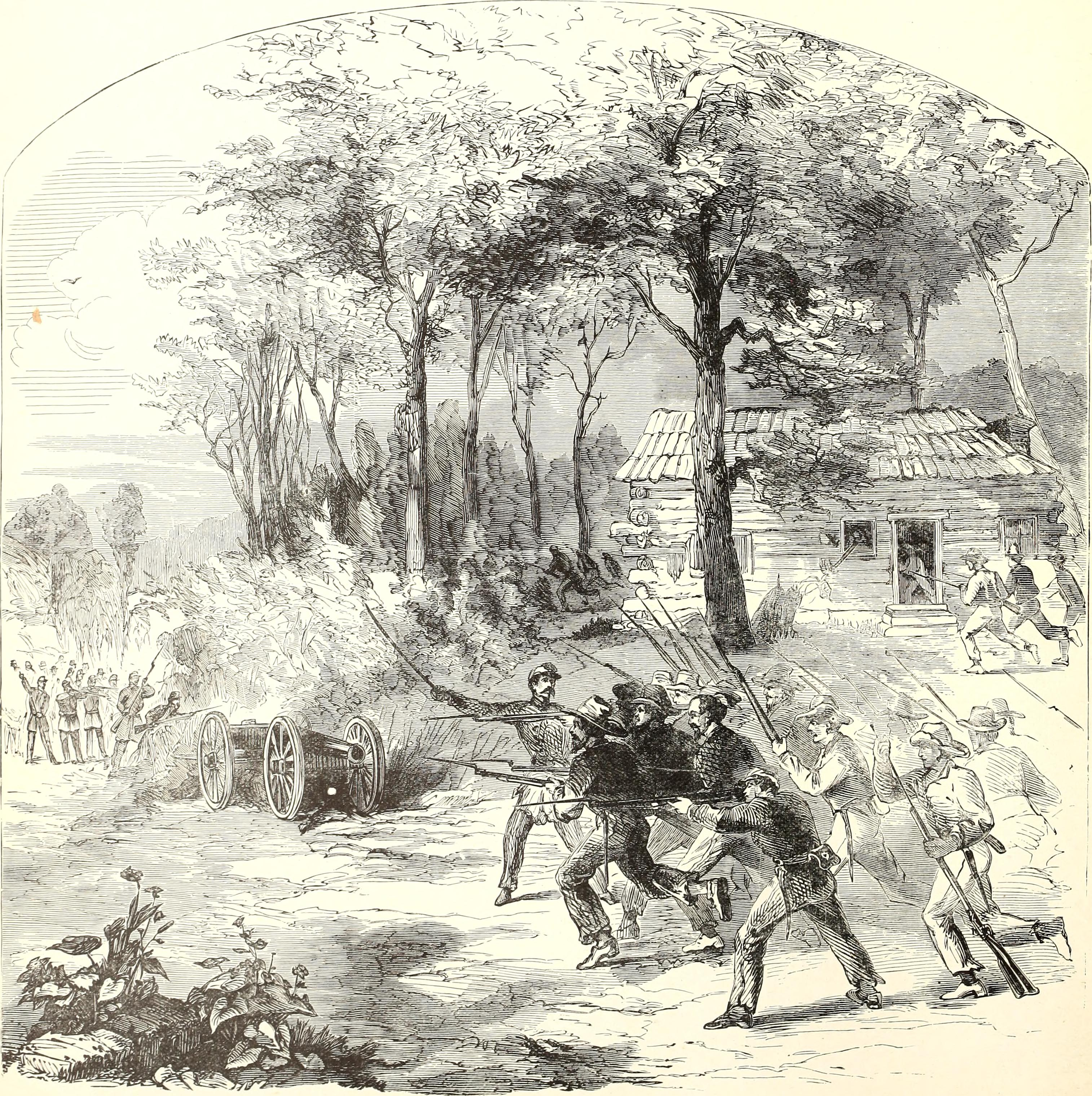
Frank Leslie's scenes and portraits of the Civil War

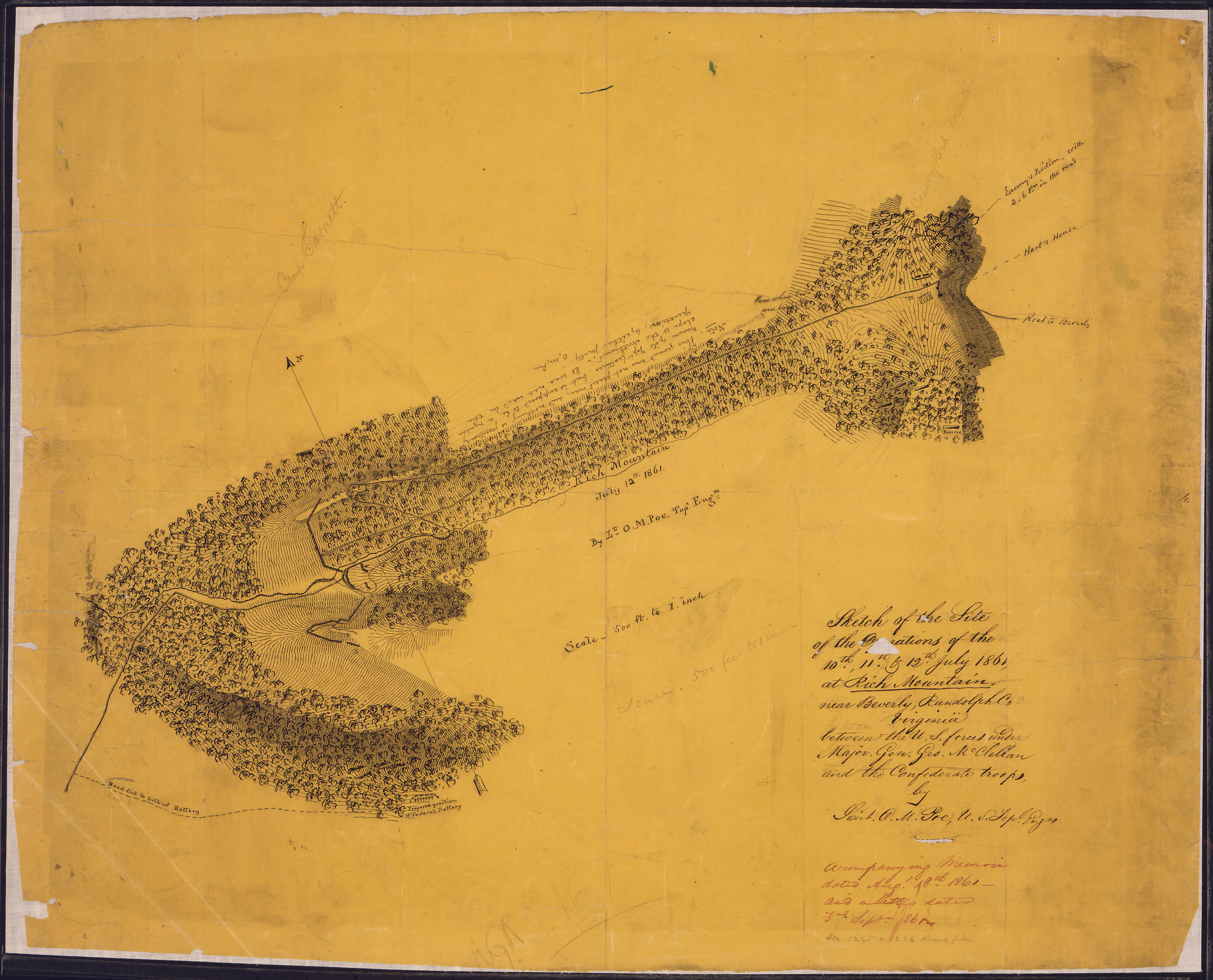
Sketch of the Site of the Operations of the 10th, 11th, & 12th, July 1861, at Rich Mountain near Beverly.

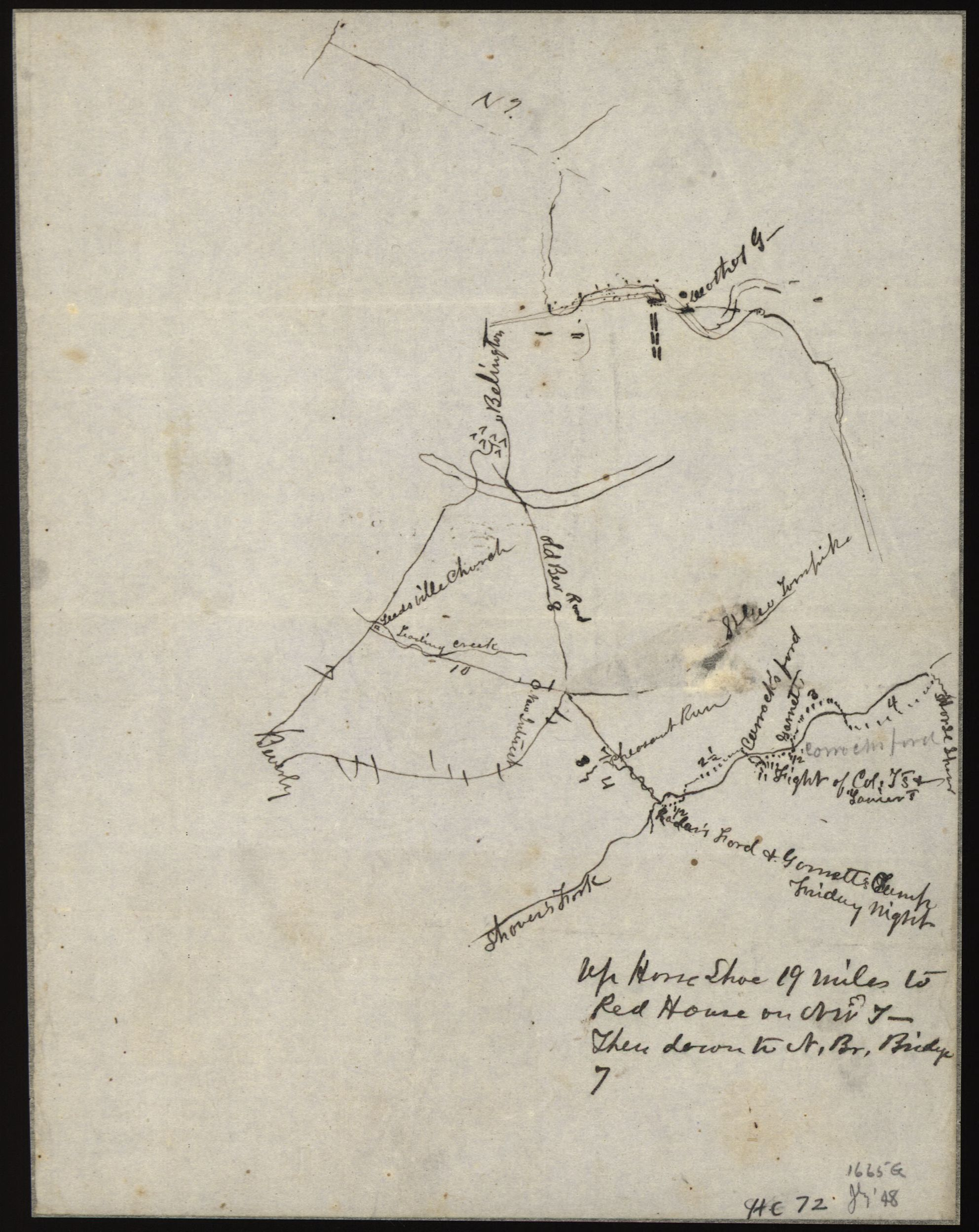

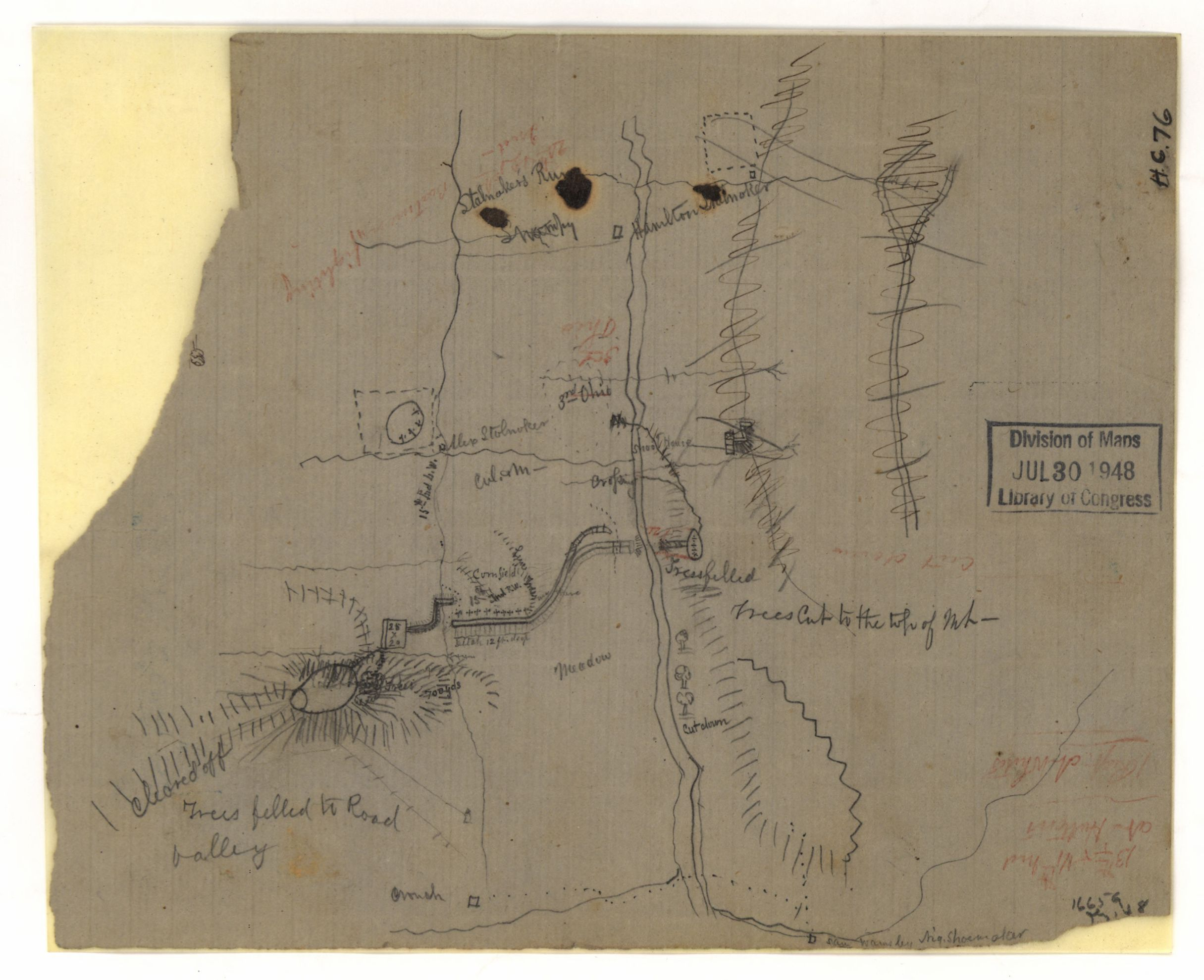

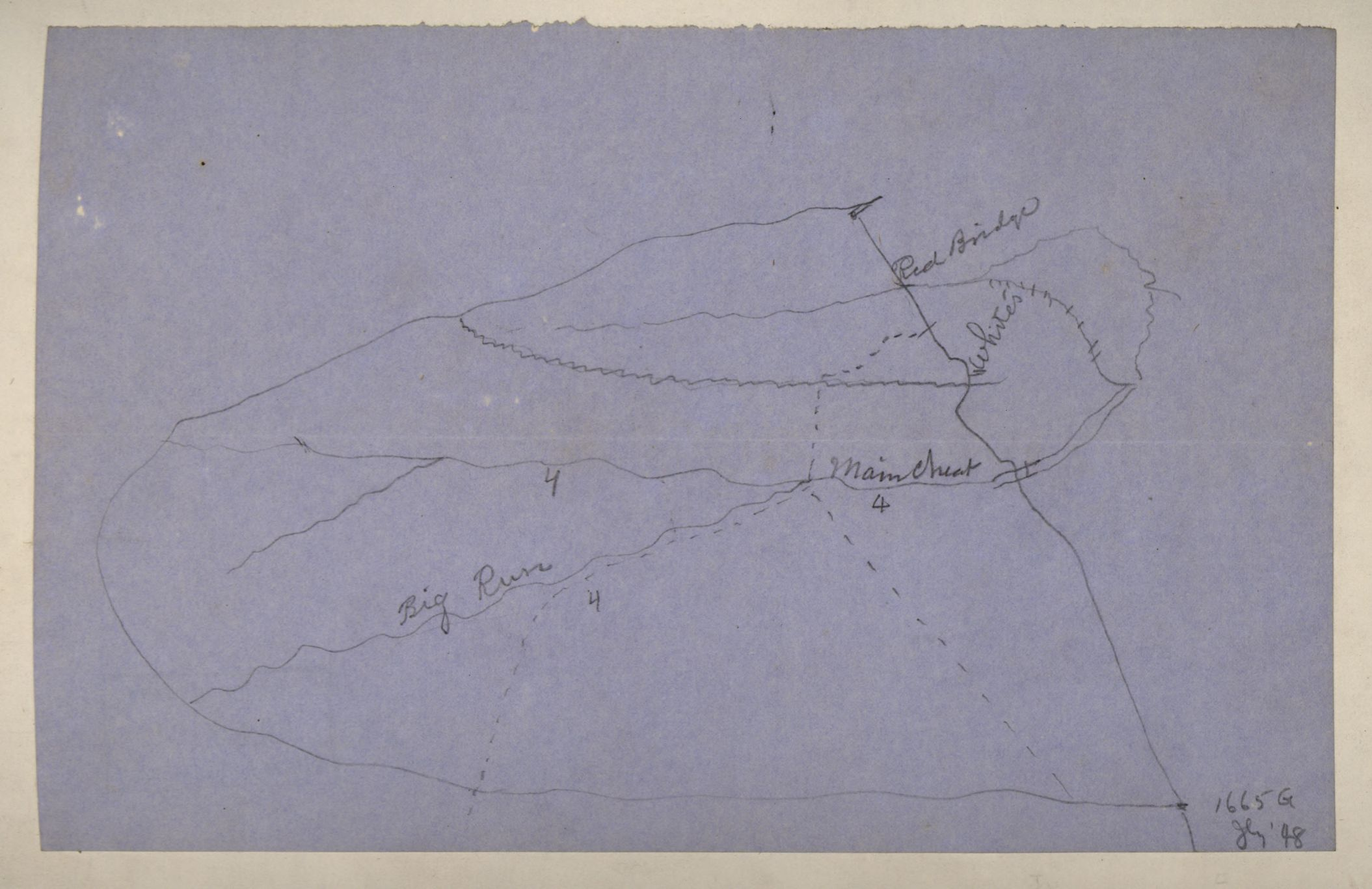

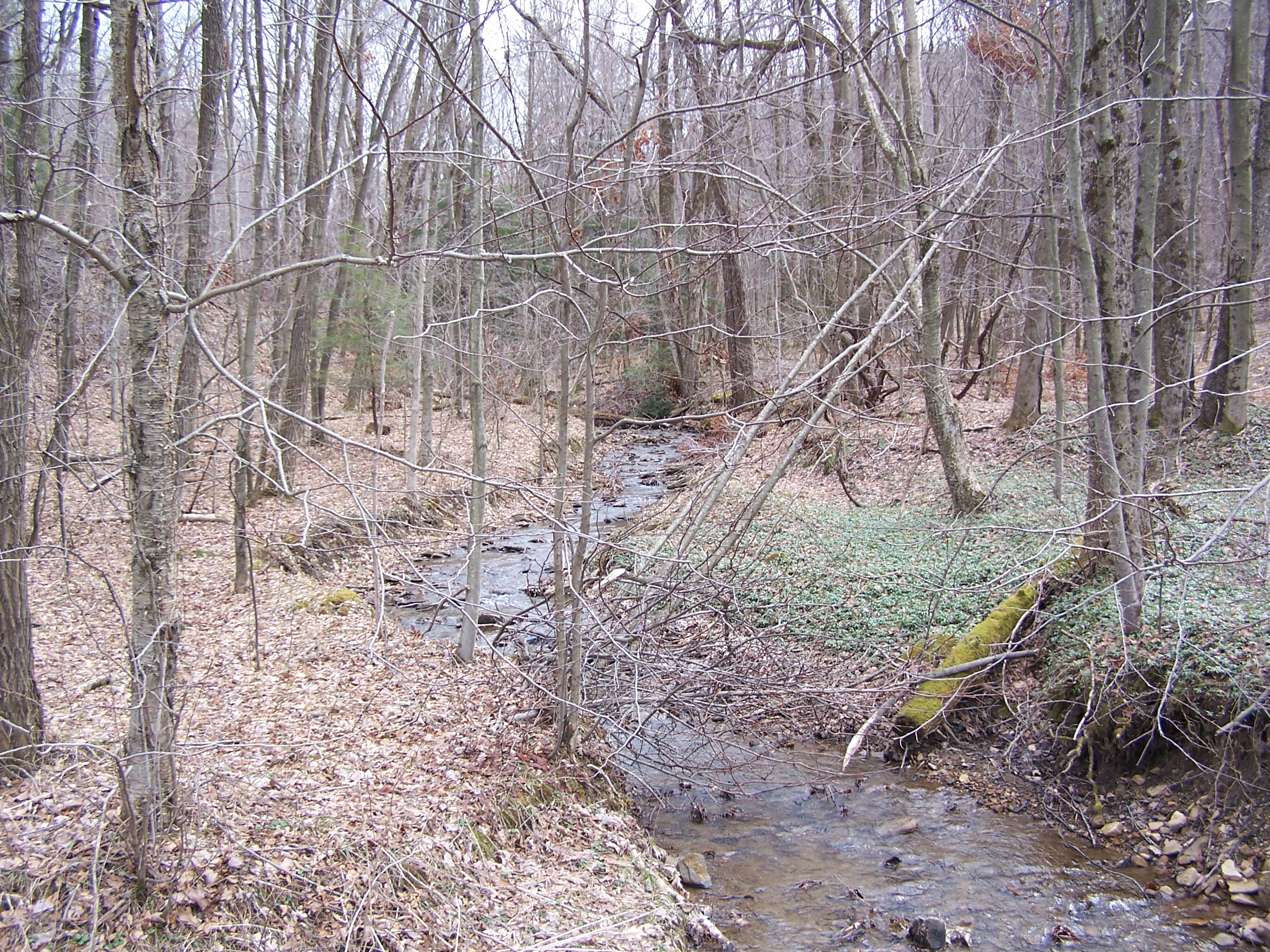
Camp Garnett

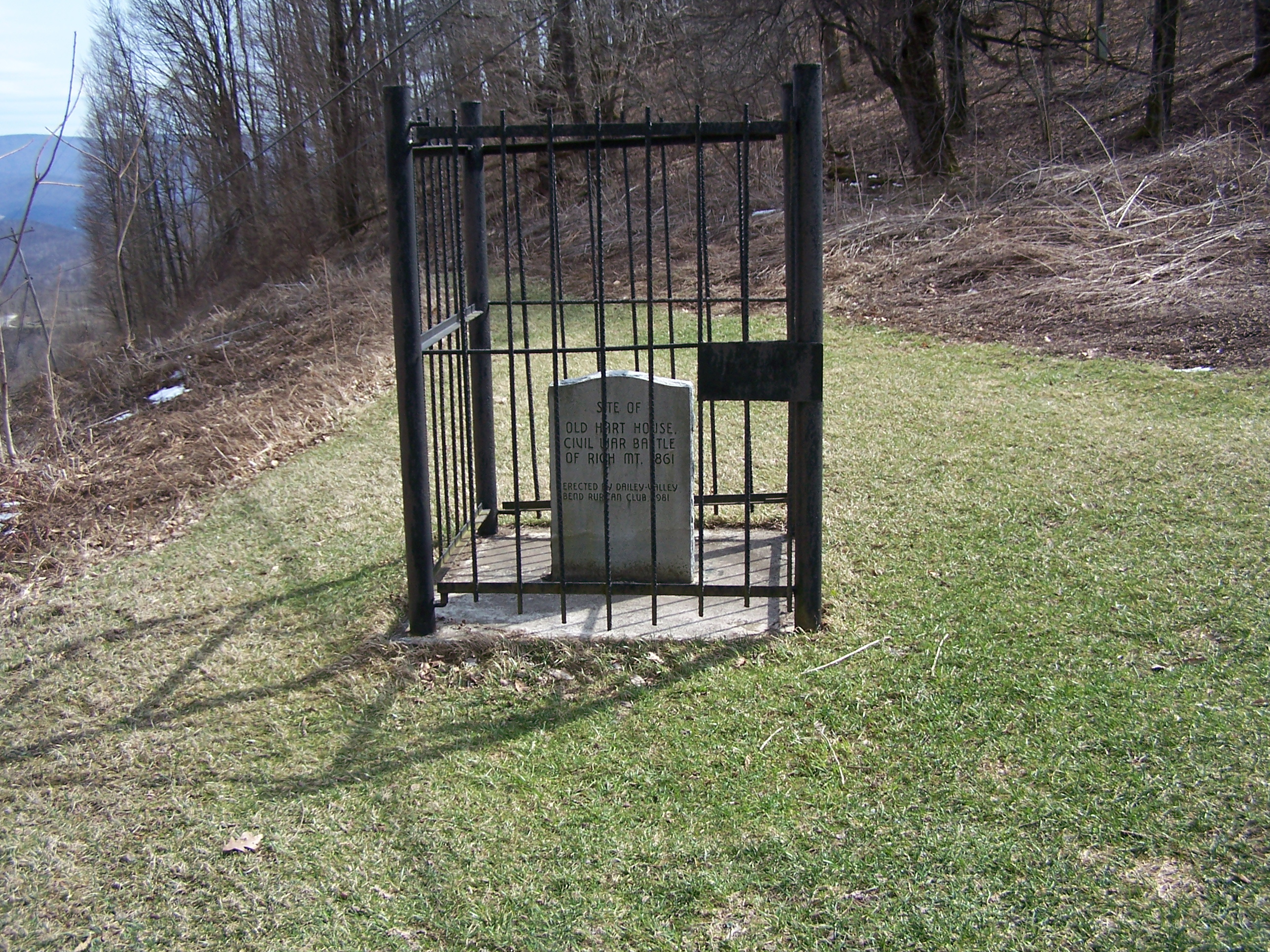
Marker on site of Hart House

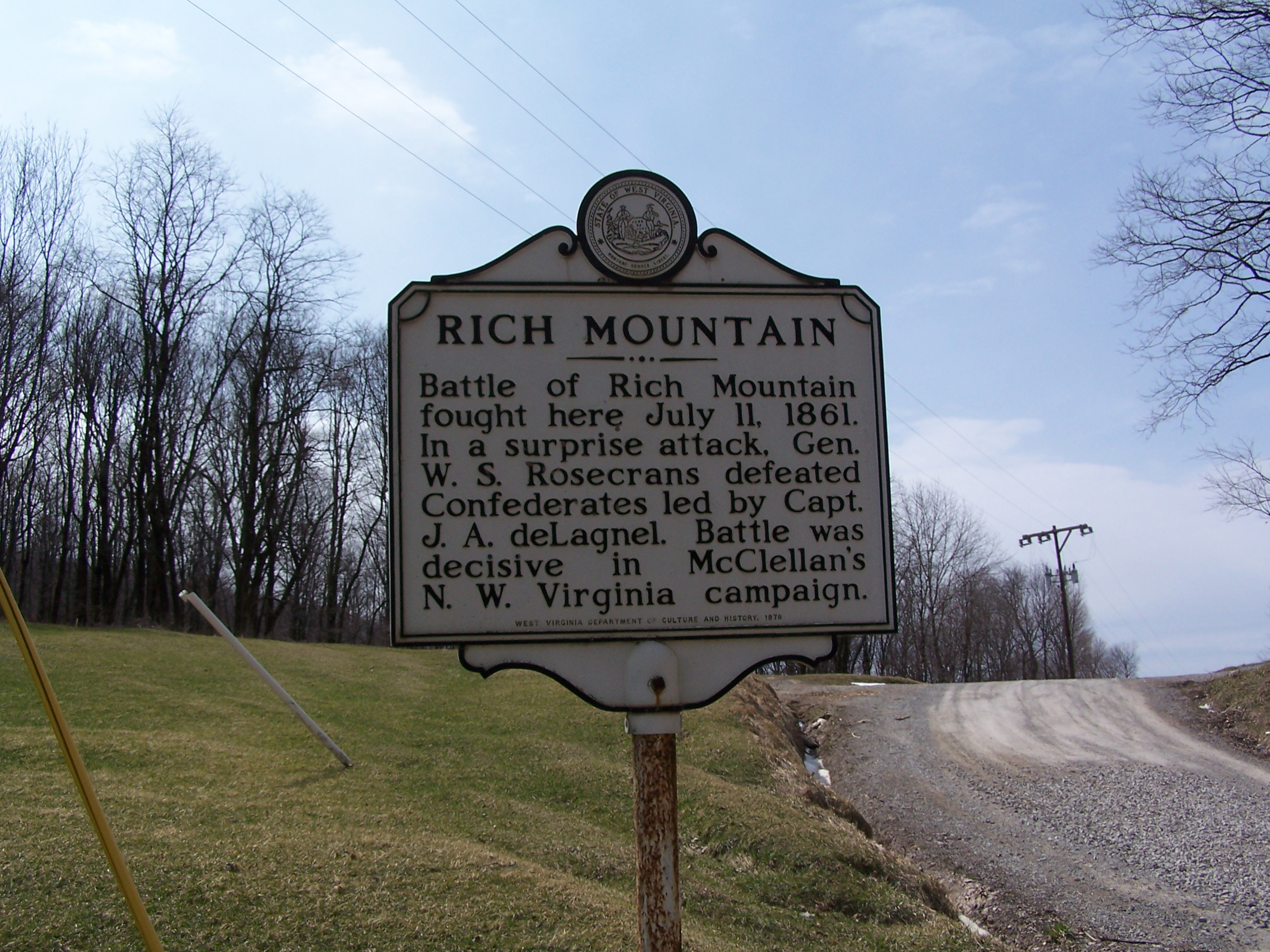
Historical Marker on Rich Mountain

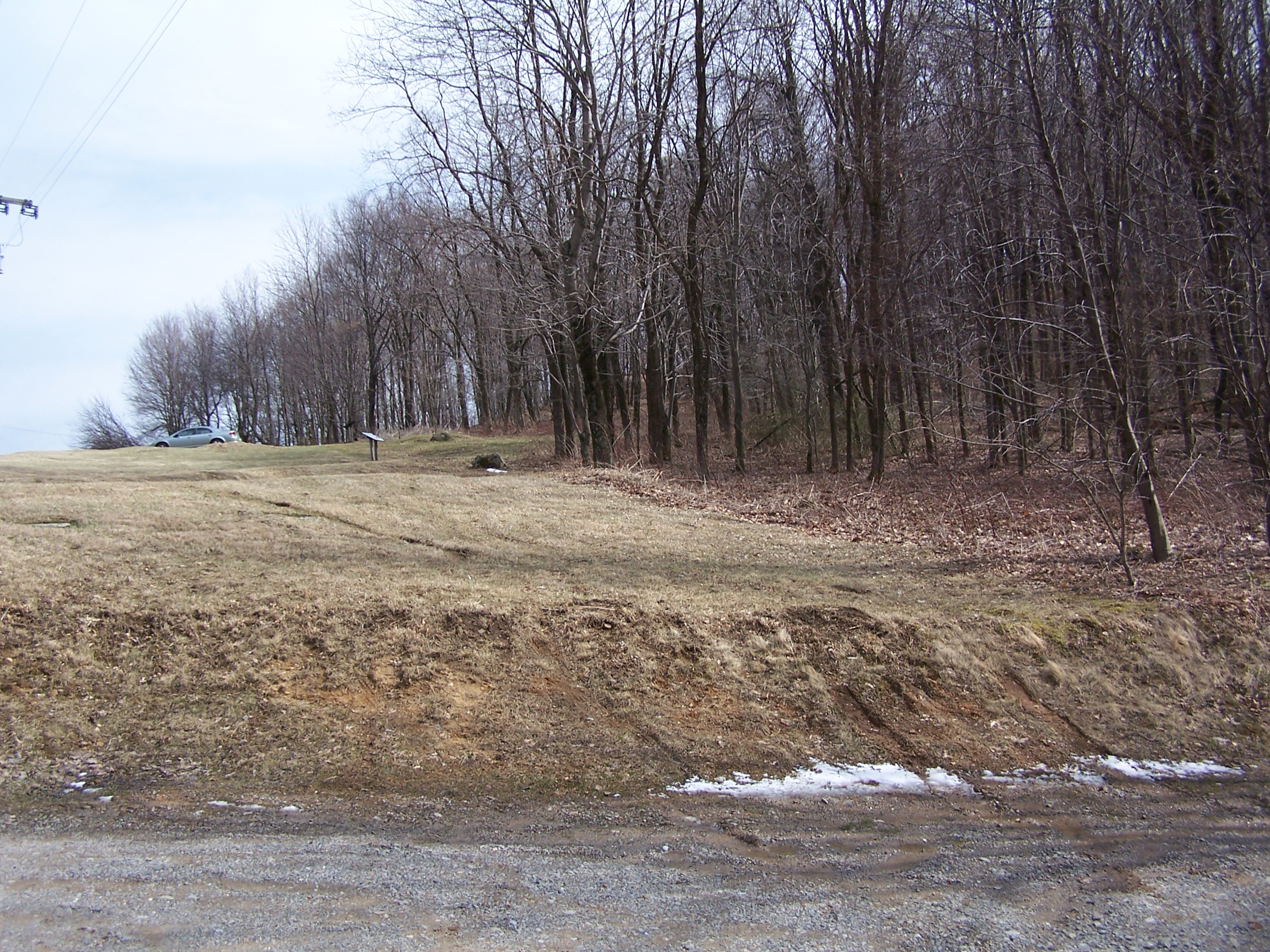
Looking at summit of Rich Mountain

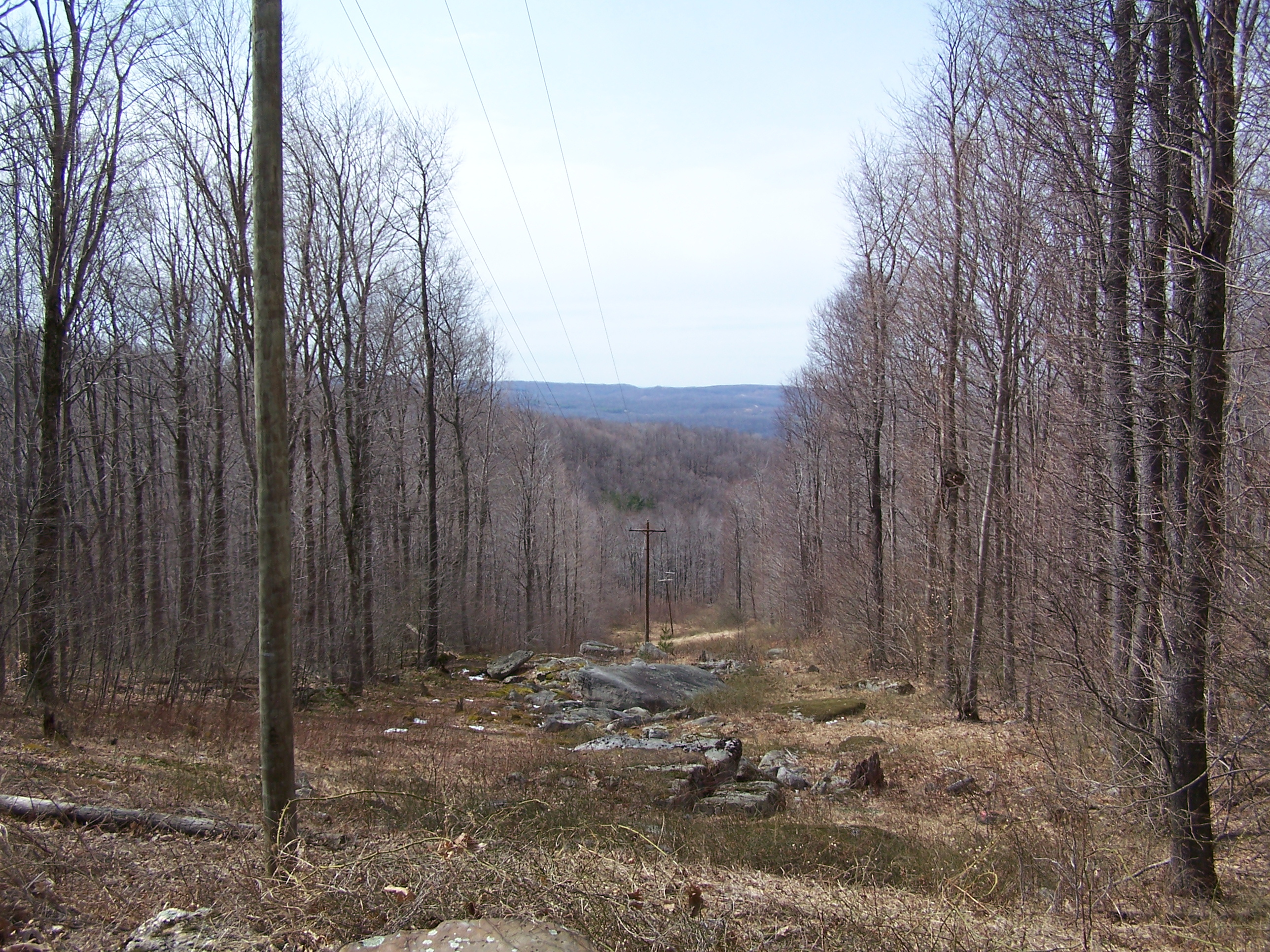
Looking westward (downhill) from Rich Mountain summit
