= William H. Christian =

United States Army colonel (1825–1887)

William Henry Christian
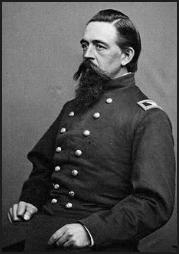
- Born: April 9, 1825; Utica, New York, United States
- Died: May 8, 1887 (aged 62); Utica, New York, United States
- Burial place: Forest Lawn Cemetery, Utica, New York, United States
- Military career
- Allegiance: United States (Union)
- Branch: United States Army (Union Army)
- Service years: 1846 – 1862
- Rank: Brevet Brigadier General
- Commands: 26th New York Infantry Regiment
- Conflicts: Mexican–American War; American Civil War; Manassas campaign; First Battle of Bull Run; Northern Virginia campaign; Second Battle of Bull Run; Battle of Chantilly; Maryland campaign; Battle of South Mountain; Battle of Antietam

William Henry Christian (1825-1887) was an American Brevet Brigadier General who served during the American Civil War. He commanded the 26th New York Infantry Regiment and led a brigade at the Battle of Antietam. He was known for being unnerved during the battle, and for the deterioration of his mental state after the war.

== Biography ==
=== Early military career ===
William was born on April 9, 1825, in Utica, New York. He initially entered military service as a member of the 1st New York Volunteers for the Mexican–American War He spent his first two months of training at Governor's Island before being transferred to San Francisco but saw no active military service during the war although seemed worthy enough to be promoted to First Sergeant by the end of the war. After the war, he stayed in California due to the California Gold Rush occurring and became a teacher before returning to New York in 1856 as he became a city surveyor for Utica. He then renewed his service in the New York Militia in the years prior to the American Civil War as a drillmaster.

=== American Civil War ===
When the American Civil War broke out, Christian traveled to Albany where he personally asked Governor Edwin D. Morgan for permission to raise a regiment of volunteers and Morgan saw Christian to be the ideal person to rally troops from Utica as he was a veteran of the Mexican–American War and granted Christian permission to do so and in a few weeks, managed to rally over 1,000 Men needed to form the 26th New York Infantry Regiment and was appointed as first commander on May 21, 1861. Christian was described as being a strict disciplinarian but proved to be beneficial as the soldiers were now well-drilled. Another differing aspect of Christian's training was the prohibition of the consumption of alcohol and insisted that his officers sign a temperance pledge. His training was described as having "military skill and energy," having "the best-drilled volunteer regiment," and "energy and firmness."

After arriving on Washington, D.C., on April 22, 1861, the 26th New York settled at Meridian Hill before experiencing their first battle at the First Battle of Bull Run although their only service was covering the retreating Union soldiers although was notable enough to receive direct praise from Abraham Lincoln himself.

After the First Battle of Bull Run, Christian and the 26th New York wouldn't see any military service for 6 months before being assigned as a part of the new Army of the Potomac and being a part of Henry Warner Slocum's brigade and soon took the 26th New York to a new camp in Alexandria, Virginia. Christian finally saw his first instance of active military service when him and along with 350 men, were stationed at Pohick Church on October 21, 1861, to capture Confederate cavalry operating there but proved to be a disaster as his targets escaped unharmed, his soldiers proceeding to pillage Alexandria along with one of his men accidentally killing another.

After the disaster, Christian was supposed be faced in the Court of Inquiry but due to the case being dropped, General Slocum transferred Christian and the 26th to Fort Lyon. During this time, he married Mary Timmerman on November 6, 1861, and both remained on the fort until May 1862 until when new orders arrived that the 26th New York would be transferred to Irvin McDowell's III Corps of the new Army of Virginia of John Pope. The 26th New York was then sent to camps near Falmouth and then Manassas and would stay there until the end of August where they joined the rest of Pope's army which located Lee's Army of Northern Virginia.

The 26th New York would then participate at the Second Battle of Bull Run as a member of the 2nd Brigade of James B. Ricketts's 2nd Division. However, when the 26th began to hold the line at Chinn Ridge, Christian was notably absent during the engagement. This was because when Longstreet's Command came to begin an assault on the line, he found Christian lying under a tree and wrapped in a blanket, being attended to by Surgeon Dr. Coventry as Christian had apparently had heatstroke and a case of poison ivy on his hands although he made a miraculous recovery and then went to take the place of Zealous Bates Tower as Brigadier as Tower was wounded and the brigade made their way back to Centreville, Virginia. His soldiers however were unimpressed by Christian's actions and held a secret meeting to whether to report Christian to his superior, Ricketts but the final result was against performing such an act.

=== Battle of Antietam ===
Christian then participated in the Battle of South Mountain and the Battle of Chantilly and although Christian was competent at both at those engagements, he only played a supporting role in the battles. Later on, Christian and his brigade marched across Antietam Creek and commenced a skirmish with the Confederate lines although the tension of the battle began to affect Christian's mental state due to the tension of uncertainty. During the early morning hours, Christian's brigade was to support Duryée's and Hartsuff's brigades in the opening attack with Christian's Brigade having to deal with the direct Confederate artillery while at the North Woods but after intense artillery, Christian himself ran into the safety of the East Woods by himself and leaving the rest of his men leaderless.

While the situation was going bad for Duryée and Hartsuff, Christian decided that now would be a good time to run the men through the manual of arms but as he was doing this, Confederate Artillery from Nicodemus Heights and the Dunker Church and the artillery strikes were sending sharp chunks of wood in the air as well as knocking down entire trees. As an attempt to escape the perilous situation, Christian ordered his men to retreat. While doing so, Richard Coulter reportedly told Christian: "For God's sake, come and help us out, our ammunition is exhausted!" and Coulter ran back to the cornfields but Christian didn't follow and stood still on the spot where he encountered Coulter.

Soon enough, Christian snapped and he fled from the scene with his horse as Christian abandoned his brigade and Coulter's men to their own fates as he proclaimed that the battle was lost. As he fled, his men could do nothing but watch, confused and left the brigade in a nearly complete leadership vacuum as they did nothing, wanting things to sort themselves out. Matters got so bad that Colonel Peter Lyle had to assume command of Christian's remaining men as well as the 90th Pennsylvania Infantry Regiment and the rest of the men would go on to redeem themselves for the rest of the battle. As for Christian himself, he was spotted shaking under a tree behind the lines by Brig. Gen. Truman Seymour. That evening, Ricketts himself called Christian to his headquarters and demanded he resign or face a court-martial and Christian chose to resign claiming that “business of importance” required him to return to Utica and he did so two days later.

=== Post-war life ===
When he got home, Christian lied about why he'd left the army, telling everyone that he left due to the intrigues of some of his fellow officers. The truth, however, eventually caught up with him, negatively affecting his mental health. After the disaster, Christian actively sought to regain any chance of a military command, even proposing at one point to serve without pay but to no avail. On December 8, 1868, President Andrew Johnson nominated Christian a posthumous promotion to brevet brigadier general.

His actions during the Civil War haunted Christian, causing Post-traumatic stress disorder. His mental state deteriorated, affecting his family, and he was no longer able to work as a surveyor and civil engineer. As an example of his worsening mental health, Christian was seen placing a saddle over the banister of his front porch, mounting it, and delivering orders to a nonexistent group of soldiers. Veterans of the 26th were kind enough to invite Christian to reunions but he would occasionally erupt into uncontrolled fits of laughter.

By early 1886, his wife had had enough of Christian and sent him to the New York State Lunatic Asylum at Utica where he spent his final days as a patient before dying on May 8, 1887. He was buried at Forest Lawn Cemetery, Utica. After the death of William, Mary applied for a pension, claiming that her husband's demise was caused by his supposed wartime heatstroke with the support from members of the 26th but the claim was denied, likely due to William's actions.

== See also ==
- List of American Civil War brevet generals (Union)
