= 83rd New York Infantry Regiment =

- Active: June 8, 1861, to June 23, 1864
- Country: United States
- Allegiance: Union
- Branch: Infantry
- Nickname(s): City Guard
- Engagements: Battle of Cedar Mountain; Northern Virginia Campaign; Battle of South Mountain; Battle of Antietam; Battle of Fredericksburg; Battle of Chancellorsville; Battle of Gettysburg; Mine Run Campaign; Battle of the Wilderness; Battle of Spotsylvania Courthouse; Battle of North Anna; Battle of Totopotomoy Creek; Battle of Cold Harbor

Insignia
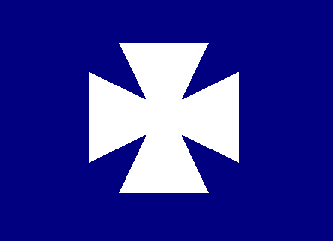
- 2nd Division, V Corps

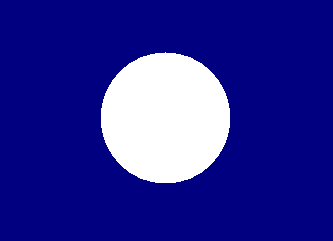
- 2nd Division, I Corps

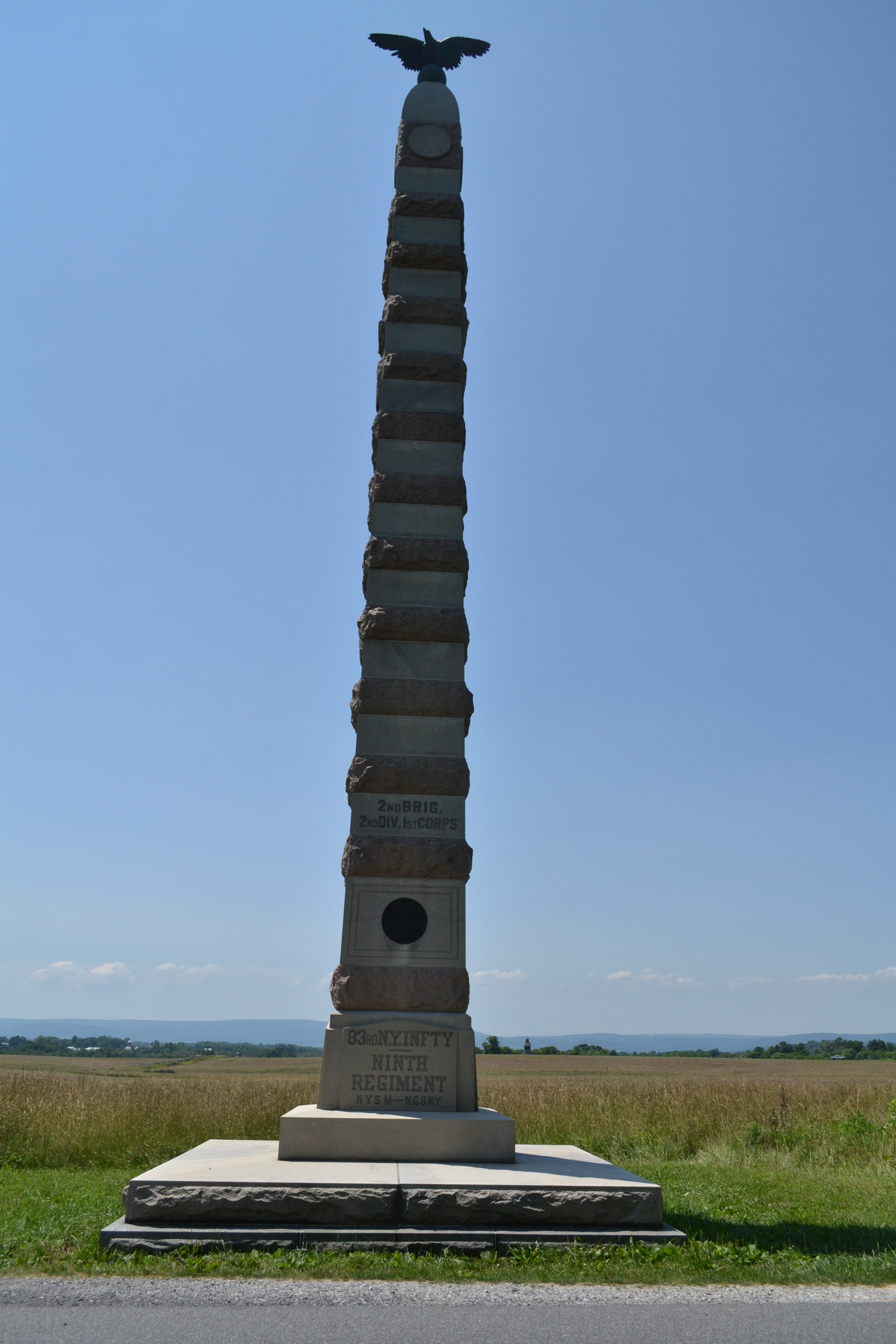
Monument to the 83rd New York Volunteer Infantry at Gettysburg

The 83rd New York Infantry Regiment, the "Ninth Militia," "Ninth Infantry National Guard," or "City Guard", was an infantry regiment of the Union Army during the American Civil War.

== Service ==
The 9th New York State Militia was not called up, but organized in New York City as a regiment of volunteers under Col. Michael M. van Beuren. The regiment left the state in May, 1861 under the leadership of Col. John W. Stiles and served at Washington, DC, mustering in to federal service there in June; in several different commands until August; in the Army of the Potomac from October; in 5th Corps, from March, 1862; in 3d Corps, Army of Virginia, from June; and in 1st Corps, Army of Potomac, from September. In May 1863, the three years' men of the 26th Infantry were transferred in. The regiment served again in 5th Corps, Army of Potomac, from March, 1864, and was honorably discharged and mustered out at New York City in June, 1864; men not entitled to be mustered out were transferred to the 97th Infantry.

The 83rd served along the Potomac River in Maryland and at Harper's Ferry. In the spring of 1862 the regiment was stationed near Warrenton, Virginia and along the Rappahannock River; it participated in General John Pope's Virginia campaign, losing 75 men at the Battle of Second Bull Run. At South Mountain and Antietam, Confederate forces heavily engaged the 83rd, costing 114 at Antietam. The regiment lost even more at Fredericksburg—125 killed, wounded or missing—among whom was the severely wounded Colonel Hendrickson. The regiment spent the winter of 1862-3 at Falmouth, Virginia, and was not threatened during Chancellorsville, but played an important part at Gettysburg in the capture of Iverson's North Carolina brigade. Coming south, the regiment was stationed at Hagerstown, Maryland, and Liberty, Virginia; the 83rd camped near Brandy Station, Virginia, in the early winter of 1863-4. It served during the Wilderness campaign, where Colonel Moesch was killed and 128 men were reported killed, wounded or missing. The 83d was named as one of the "three hundred fighting regiments."

== Total strength and casualties ==
The total enrollment of the regiment was 1,413 members; during its service the regiment lost by death; killed in action, 8 officers, 103 enlisted men; of wounds received in action, 1 officer, 52 enlisted men; of disease and other causes, 2 officers, 89 enlisted men; total, 11 officers, 244 enlisted men; aggregate, 255; of whom 16 enlisted men died in the hands of the enemy.

== Commanders ==
- Colonel John W. Stiles
- Colonel John Hendrickson
- Colonel Joseph A. Moesch
- Lieutenant Colonel William Chalmers

== See also ==
- List of New York Civil War regiments
