= Samuel Henderson Allen =

American politician

Maine House of Representatives
- In office 1856–1856

Personal details
- Born: Samuel Henderson Allen; October 17, 1826 Thomaston, Maine, U.S.
- Died: September 19, 1905 (aged 78)
- Party: Republican

Samuel Henderson Allen (October 17, 1826 – September 19, 1905) was an American businessman, prison warden, and politician from Maine. He served one term in the Maine legislature and later served as an officer during the Civil War.

== Career ==
Henderson was a founding member of the Maine Republican Party. He was elected to the Maine House of Representatives in 1856 from his home in Thomaston. In May 1861, he was named Deputy Collector of Customs of the Port of Thomaston, a patronage position due to the election of Republican Abraham Lincoln.

=== Military service ===
He resigned in October of that year and instead was appointed Major in the 1st Maine Volunteer Cavalry Regiment. He was promoted to colonel the following May. In September 1862, he was appointed military governor of Frederick, Maryland and served until his resignation from the Union Army on January 5, 1863, due to poor health.

=== Private sector and business career ===
After leaving the army, Allen traveled to California and Nevada before returning East. He worked for Charles Gould and Amos Gaylord Throop to purchase land for mining in Kentucky and West Virginia. In 1865, he worked in the oil business of western Pennsylvania. From 1877 to 1888, he was involved in the sale of lumber and ice from Maine's Kennebec River. In 1888, he was appointed Ward of the Maine State Prison, a position held until at least 1900.

Henderson was a member of the Military Order of the Loyal Legion of the United States (MOLLUS) as well as the Grand Army of the Republic (GAR).

== Death ==
He died in 1905 at the age of 79.
