= Battle of Cedar Mountain order of battle: Confederate =

The following Confederate States Army units and commanders fought in the Battle of Cedar Mountain of the American Civil War. The Union order of battle is shown separately.

== Abbreviations used ==
=== Military rank ===
- MG = Major General
- BG = Brigadier General
- Col = Colonel
- Ltc = Lieutenant Colonel
- Maj = Major
- Cpt = Captain
- Lt = Lieutenant
- Sgt = Sergeant

=== Other ===
- w = wounded
- mw = mortally wounded
- k = killed

== Left Wing, Army of Northern Virginia ==
MG Thomas J. Jackson

Division	Brigade	Regiments and Others
Ewell's Division; MG Richard S. Ewell	Early's Brigade BG Jubal A. Early	13th Virginia Infantry; 25th Virginia Infantry; 31st Virginia Infantry; 52nd Virginia Infantry; 58th Virginia Infantry; 12th Georgia: Cpt James G. Rodgers
Ewell's Division; MG Richard S. Ewell	Hay's Brigade Col Henry Forno	5th Louisiana; 6th Louisiana; 7th Louisiana; 8th Louisiana; 14th Louisiana
Ewell's Division; MG Richard S. Ewell	Trimble's Brigade BG Isaac R. Trimble	15th Alabama; 21st Georgia; 21st North Carolina
Ewell's Division; MG Richard S. Ewell	Artillery A.R. Courtney	Louisiana Guard Battery (D’Aquin's); Brown's (Md.) Battery; Dement's (Md.) Battery; Latimer's (Va.) Battery; Bedford (Va.) Artillery
Light Division; MG A.P. Hill	Branch's Brigade BG Lawrence O'Bryan Branch	7th North Carolina; 18th North Carolina; 28th North Carolina; 33rd North Carolina; 37th North Carolina
Light Division; MG A.P. Hill	Archer's Brigade BG James J. Archer	19th Georgia; 1st Tennessee; 7th Tennessee; 14th Tennessee; 5th Alabama Battalion
Light Division; MG A.P. Hill	Thomas's Brigade BG Edward L. Thomas	14th Georgia; 35th Georgia; 45th Georgia; 49th Georgia
Light Division; MG A.P. Hill	Gregg's Brigade BG Maxcy Gregg	1st South Carolina; 1st South Carolina (Orr's) Rifles; 12th South Carolina; 13th South Carolina; 14th South Carolina
Light Division; MG A.P. Hill	Starke's Brigade BG William E. Starke	1st Louisiana; 2nd Louisiana; 9th Louisiana; 10th Louisiana; 15th Louisiana
Light Division; MG A.P. Hill	Field's Brigade BG Charles W. Field	40th Virginia Infantry; 47th Virginia Infantry; 55th Virginia Infantry; 22nd Virginia Infantry Battalion
Light Division; MG A.P. Hill	Pender's Brigade BG William D. Pender	16th North Carolina; 22nd North Carolina; 34th North Carolina; 38th North Carolina
Light Division; MG A.P. Hill	Artillery R. Lindsay Walker	Latham's (N.C.) Battery; Pee Dee (S.C.) Artillery; Fredericksburg (Va.) Artillery; Letcher (Va.) Artillery; Middlesex (Va.) Artillery; Purcell (Va.) Artillery
Jackson's Division; BG Charles S. Winder (mw); BG William B. Taliaferro	Stonewall Brigade Col Charles A. Ronald	2nd Virginia Infantry: Ltc Lawson Botts; 4th Virginia Infantry: Ltc R. D. Gardner; 5th Virginia Infantry: Maj H. J. Williams; 27th Virginia Infantry: Cpt Charles L. Haynes; 33rd Virginia Infantry: Ltc Edwin G. Lee
Jackson's Division; BG Charles S. Winder (mw); BG William B. Taliaferro	Second Brigade Col T.S. Garnett	21st Virginia Infantry: Ltc R. H. Cunningham (k), Cpt W. A. Witcher; 42nd Virginia Infantry: Maj Henry Lane (mw), Cpt Abner Dobyns; 48th Virginia Infantry: Cpt William Y. C. Hannum; 1st Virginia (Irish) Battalion: Maj John Seddon
Jackson's Division; BG Charles S. Winder (mw); BG William B. Taliaferro	Third Brigade Col Alexander G. Taliaferro	47th Alabama: Ltc James W. Jackson; 48th Alabama: Col James L. Sheffield (w), Ltc Abner A. Hughes; 10th Virginia Infantry: Maj Joshua Stover; 23rd Virginia Infantry: Ltc George W. Curtis (mw), Maj Simon T. Walton; 37th Virginia Infantry: Col T. V. Williams (w), Maj H. C. Wood
Jackson's Division; BG Charles S. Winder (mw); BG William B. Taliaferro	Fourth Brigade BG Alexander R. Lawton	13th Georgia; 26th Georgia; 31st Georgia; 38th Georgia; 60th Georgia; 61st Georgia
Jackson's Division; BG Charles S. Winder (mw); BG William B. Taliaferro	Artillery Maj R. Snowden Andrews (w)	Alleghany (Va.) Artillery; Hampden (Va.) Artillery; Rockbridge (Va.) Artillery

=== Cavalry ===
Brigades	Regiments and batteries
Robertson's Brigade BG Beverly H. Robertson	6th Virginia Cavalry; 7th Virginia Cavalry; 12th Virginia Cavalry; 17th Virginia Cavalry Battalion; 2nd Virginia Cavalry (detachment); 4th Virginia Cavalry (detachment); Chew's (Va.) Battery
