= 26th New York Infantry Regiment =

- Active: May 21, 1861, to May 28, 1863
- Country: United States
- Allegiance: Union
- Branch: Army
- Type: Infantry
- Engagements: Battle of Cedar Mountain; Second Battle of Bull Run; Battle of Chantilly; Battle of South Mountain; Battle of Antietam; Battle of Fredericksburg; Battle of Chancellorsville

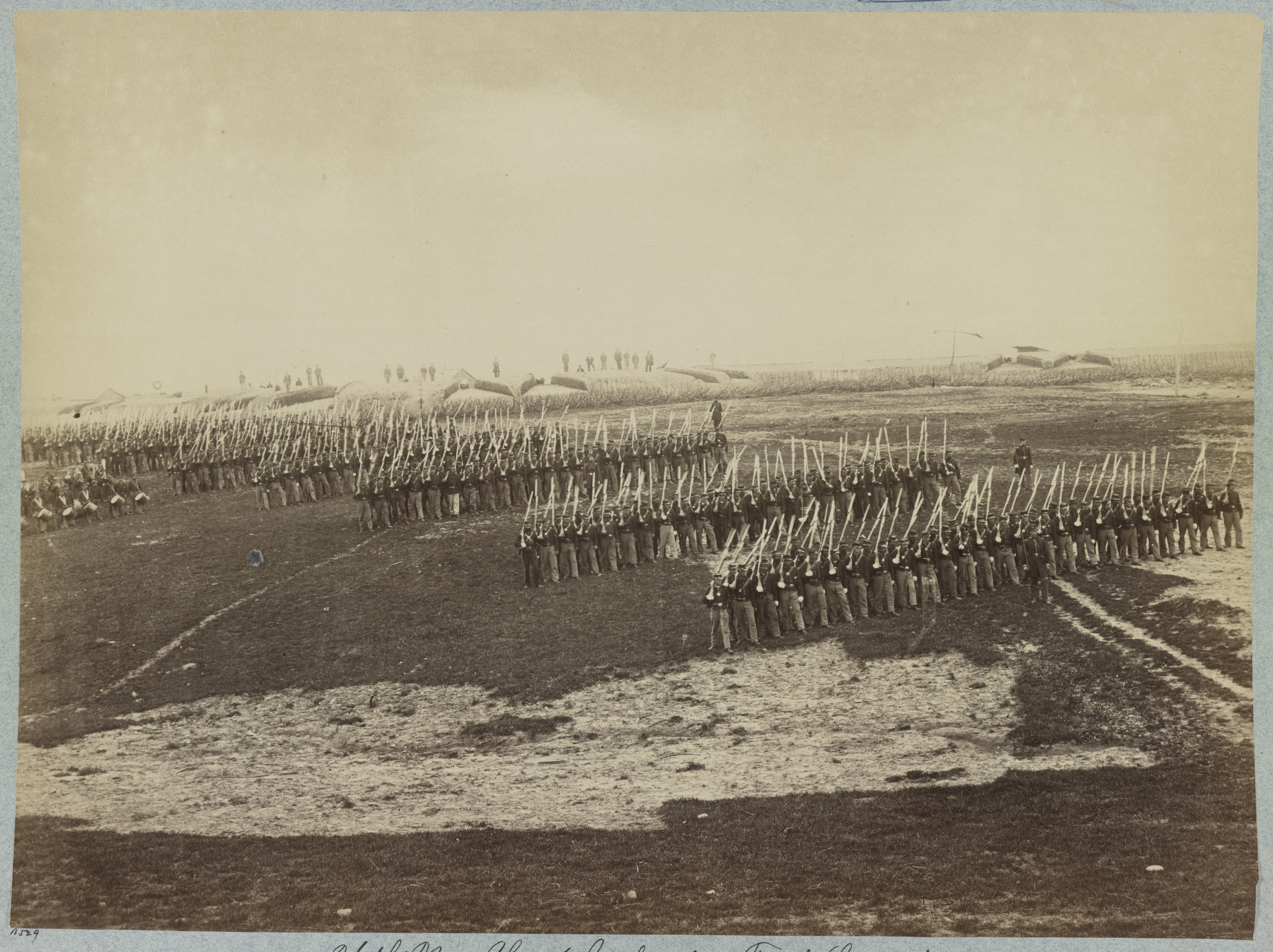
The 26th New York Infantry at Fort Lyon (Virginia).

The 26th New York Infantry Regiment, the "2nd Oneida Regiment", was an infantry regiment that served in the Union Army during the American Civil War.

== Service ==
The 26th New York was organized in Elmira, New York, under command of Colonel William H. Christian Lieutenant Colonel Richard A. Richardson and Major Gibert S. Jennings, and was mustered in for a two-year enlistment on May 21, 1861.

The regiment was mustered out of service on May 28, 1863, and those men who had signed three year enlistments or who re-enlisted were transferred to the 97th New York.

== Total strength and casualties ==
The regiment suffered 5 officers and 101 enlisted men who were killed in action or mortally wounded and 42 enlisted men who died of disease, for a total of 148 fatalities.

== See also ==
- List of New York Civil War regiments
