= James B. Ricketts =

American Civil War Union general (1817–1887)

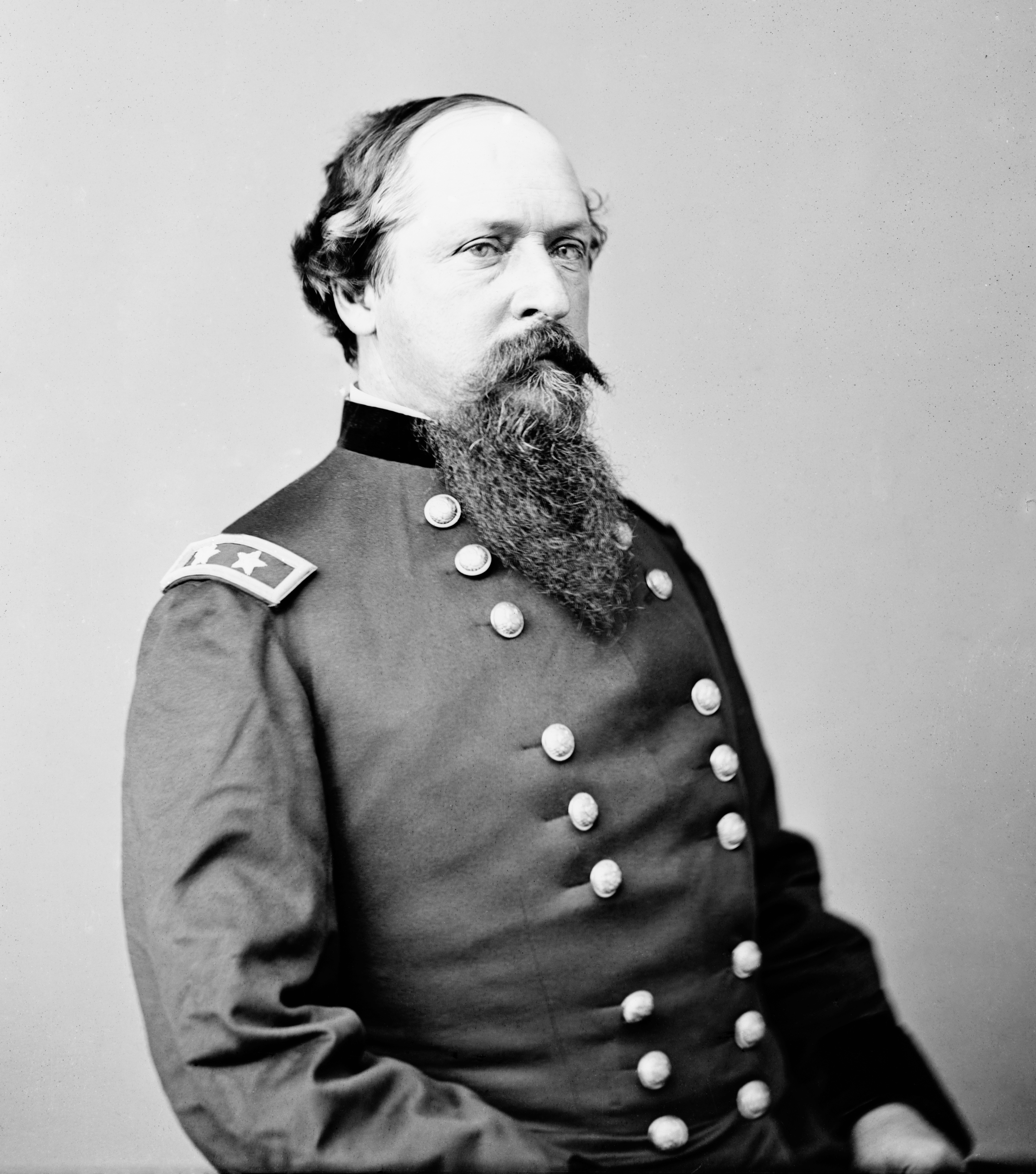
- Photograph by Mathew Brady, c. 1855–1865
- Born: June 21, 1817; New York City, US
- Died: September 22, 1887 (aged 70); Washington, D.C., US
- Burial place: Arlington National Cemetery
- Military career
- Allegiance: United States (Union)
- Branch: United States Army; Union Army
- Service years: 1839–1867
- Rank: Major General
- Commands: I Corps, Army of Virginia
- Conflicts: Mexican–American War; Seminole Wars; American Civil War

James Brewerton Ricketts (June 21, 1817 – September 22, 1887) was a career officer in the United States Army, serving as a Union Army general during the Civil War.

At First Bull Run, he was wounded and captured, but later exchanged. He fought at Second Bull Run and Antietam, where he was badly injured when his horse fell on him. While recuperating, he served on the Fitz John Porter court-martial, a highly political case, where his loyalties are believed to have cost him promotion. Later he commanded a division in the Overland Campaign, and a corps in the Shenandoah Valley Campaign under Sheridan, where he received a chest wound at Cedar Creek that disabled him for life.

== Early life and career ==
Ricketts was born in New York City. He graduated 16th in a class of 31 at the United States Military Academy in 1839 and was assigned to the 1st U.S. Artillery. Ricketts was married twice, first to Harriet Pierce, in 1840, daughter of Benjamin Kendrick Pierce (brother of future U.S. President Franklin Pierce) and Josette Laframboise. They had one child, a daughter Mary Brewerton Ricketts, born in 1842. After Harriet's death in 1854, he married Frances "Fanny" Lawrence (1835–1900) and they had two children, Frances Brewerton (1866–1946) and Basil Norris (1868–1910). He served during the Canada border disturbances on garrison duty and then was promoted to first lieutenant in April 1846. Ricketts saw considerable action during the Mexican–American War, participating in the Battle of Monterrey, and as commander of a gun, along with Abner Doubleday, held the Rinconada Pass during the Battle of Buena Vista. Despite his active service, he received no brevet promotions during the Mexican–American War, unlike many of his fellow officers.

Following his return from Mexico, Ricketts served in various army posts. He was promoted to captain in August 1853 and served in Florida against the Seminole Indians, and subsequently on frontier duty in Texas.

== Civil War ==
At the beginning of the Civil War, Ricketts served in the defenses of Washington, D.C., and commanded an artillery battery in the capture of Confederate-held Alexandria, Virginia, in early 1861. His battery was then attached to William B. Franklin's Brigade of Samuel Heintzelman's Division. He was shot four times and captured at the First Battle of Bull Run on July 21 when his battery, Battery I, 1st U.S. Artillery, was overrun by Confederate infantry. For his personal bravery in the face of overwhelming odds, on that same day Ricketts was brevetted as a lieutenant colonel in the Regular Army. He was confined as a prisoner of war in Richmond, although his wife Fannie was allowed to travel to Richmond and stay with him as his nurse. On December 18, 1861, he was exchanged for Confederate Colonel Julius A. De Lagnel. Ricketts was not paroled until January 1862, when he was placed on medical leave to recuperate. On April 30, 1862, President Abraham Lincoln appointed Ricketts a brigadier general of volunteers to rank from July 21, 1861. The President had nominated Ricketts for the promotion on March 27, 1862, and the U.S. Senate confirmed the appointment on April 28, 1862.

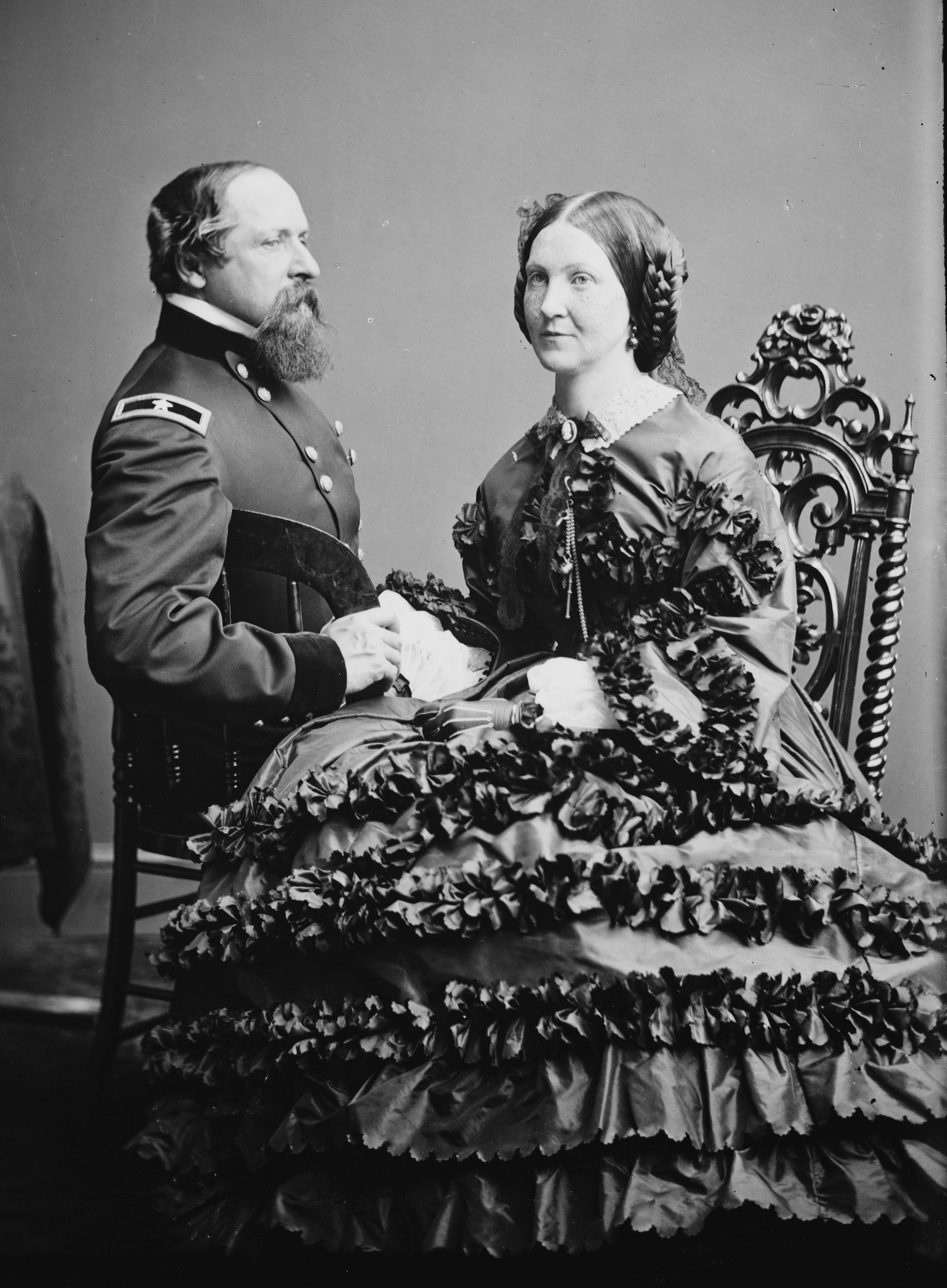
James and Fannie Ricketts

On his return to duty, Ricketts was assigned to command of a division in Irvin McDowell's corps, which he commanded at the Battle of Cedar Mountain, where he covered Nathaniel P. Banks's withdrawal. At Second Bull Run, his division was thrown forward by McDowell into Thoroughfare Gap to bar the advance of James Longstreet, who was seeking to unite his wing with that of Stonewall Jackson. Ricketts, who was being flanked and in danger of being cut off, withdrew. At the subsequent Battle of Antietam, he had two horses killed under him and he was badly injured when the second one fell on him. When he recovered sufficiently for duty, he was appointed to the Fitz John Porter court-martial. The trial was created to convict, with every judge beholden to Edwin M. Stanton for tenure or impending promotion except for Benjamin M. Prentiss. Ricketts probably voted for acquittal and was not promoted.

He did not return to the field until March 1864, when he was assigned to a division of John Sedgwick's VI Corps, which he led through Ulysses S. Grant's Overland Campaign. Many of his men were former members of Robert H. Milroy's maligned Winchester command, widely derided as "Milroy's weary boys." The division performed poorly at the Battle of the Wilderness, having one of its brigadiers and several hundred men taken prisoner by the Confederates, and without note at Spotsylvania Court House. However, Ricketts received the brevet of colonel, Regular Army, for gallant and meritorious services at Cold Harbor, Virginia, June 3, 1864, where he and his men performed well.

In July 1864, Ricketts and his command, numbering only 3,350 men, were sent north to oppose Jubal Early's attack on Washington, D.C. Ricketts fought at the Battle of Monocacy under Major General Lew Wallace, suffering the heaviest losses while holding the Union left flank. For his service there, on December 12, 1864, President Lincoln nominated Ricketts for appointment to the brevet grade of major general of volunteers, to rank from August 1, 1864, and the U.S. Senate confirmed the appointment on February 14, 1865. Ricketts was engaged in Philip Sheridan's Shenandoah Valley Campaign. At the Battle of Cedar Creek, he commanded the VI Corps in the initial hours of the fighting but was wounded by a Minié ball through his chest that disabled him for life. Despite his poor health, he returned to command of his division two days before Robert E. Lee's surrender at Appomattox Court House, April 9, 1865.

== Postbellum career ==
In late July 1865, Ricketts was assigned to the command of a district in the Department of Virginia, a post he held until April 30, 1866, when he was mustered out of the volunteer service. On April 10, 1866, President Andrew Johnson nominated Ricketts for appointment to the brevet grade of brigadier general, United States Army, for gallant services at the Battle of Cedar Creek, to rank from March 13, 1865, and the U.S. Senate confirmed the appointment on May 4, 1866. On July 17, 1866, President Andrew Johnson nominated Ricketts for appointment to the brevet grade of major general, United States Army, "gallant and meritorious service in the field," to rank from March 13, 1865, and the U.S. Senate confirmed the appointment on July 23, 1866. Ricketts was appointed lieutenant colonel, 21st U.S. Infantry in July 1866, but he declined the post.

Ricketts retired from active service on January 3, 1867, due to disability from wounds received in battle, and served on various courts-martial until January 1869. He was placed on the retired list as a major general in the regular army, to rank from January 3, 1867, the date of his retirement.

Never in good health due to his chest wound suffered while serving in the Shenandoah Valley, after Ricketts retired from the army, he lived in Washington, D.C., for the rest of his life. He died there in his home on September 27, 1887, and was buried at Arlington National Cemetery, in Arlington, Virginia. His wife was buried alongside him when she died in 1900. One of their sons, Basil Norris Ricketts, served in the Rough Riders under Theodore Roosevelt during the Spanish–American War and is buried near them.

Ricketts' grave marker reads:

Assigned to artillery on the Canadian frontier. Served through the War with Mexico. Frontier duty in Texas. Engaged in twenty seven battles of the rebellion. Was wounded five times. Prisoner of war in Richmond. Died September 27, 1887 from wounds received while commanding the Sixth Army Corps in the Shenandoah Valley. He gave his honors to the world again. His blessings part to heaven, and sleeps in peace.

== Dates of rank ==
- 2nd Lieutenant - 1 July 1839
- 1st Lieutenant - 21 April 1846
- Captain - 3 August 1852
- Brevet Lieutenant Colonel - 21 July 1861
- Brigadier General, Volunteers – April 28, 1862 (DOR was July 21, 1861)
- Major – 1 June 1863
- Brevet Colonel – 3 June 1864
- Brevet Brigadier General – 13 March 1865
- Brevet Major General – 13 March 1865
- Brevet Major General, Volunteers – 13 March 1865
- Major General, Retired – 3 January 1867

== See also ==
- List of American Civil War generals (Union)

== Notes ==
Military offices
Preceded by Irwin McDowell	Commander of the III Corps (Army of Virginia); September 5–6, 1862	Succeeded by Joseph Hooker
