= George McClellan (disambiguation) =

George B. McClellan (1826–1885) was an American Civil War military leader, presidential candidate and Governor of New Jersey.

George McClellan may also refer to:

- George McClellan (physician) (1796–1847), American physician and founder of Jefferson Medical College and the Medical Department of Pennsylvania College
- George McClellan (New York politician) (1856–1927), American Democratic legislator and lawyer
- George B. McClellan Jr. (1865–1940), American Democratic legislator and academic; mayor of New York City; Princeton lecturer and professor
- George McClellan Jr. (Illinois politician), American politician
- George McClellan (police officer) (1908–1982), Canadian police official; Canada's first provincial Ombudsman
- George McClellan (anatomy professor) (1849–1913), American medical doctor
- George B. McClellan (fireboat), a fireboat operated by the FDNY
- General George B. McClellan (Ellicott), an equestrian bronze sculpture by Henry Jackson Ellicott

== See also ==
- McClellan (disambiguation)
