= Samuel McClellan =

American General in the American Revolutionary War (1730–1807)

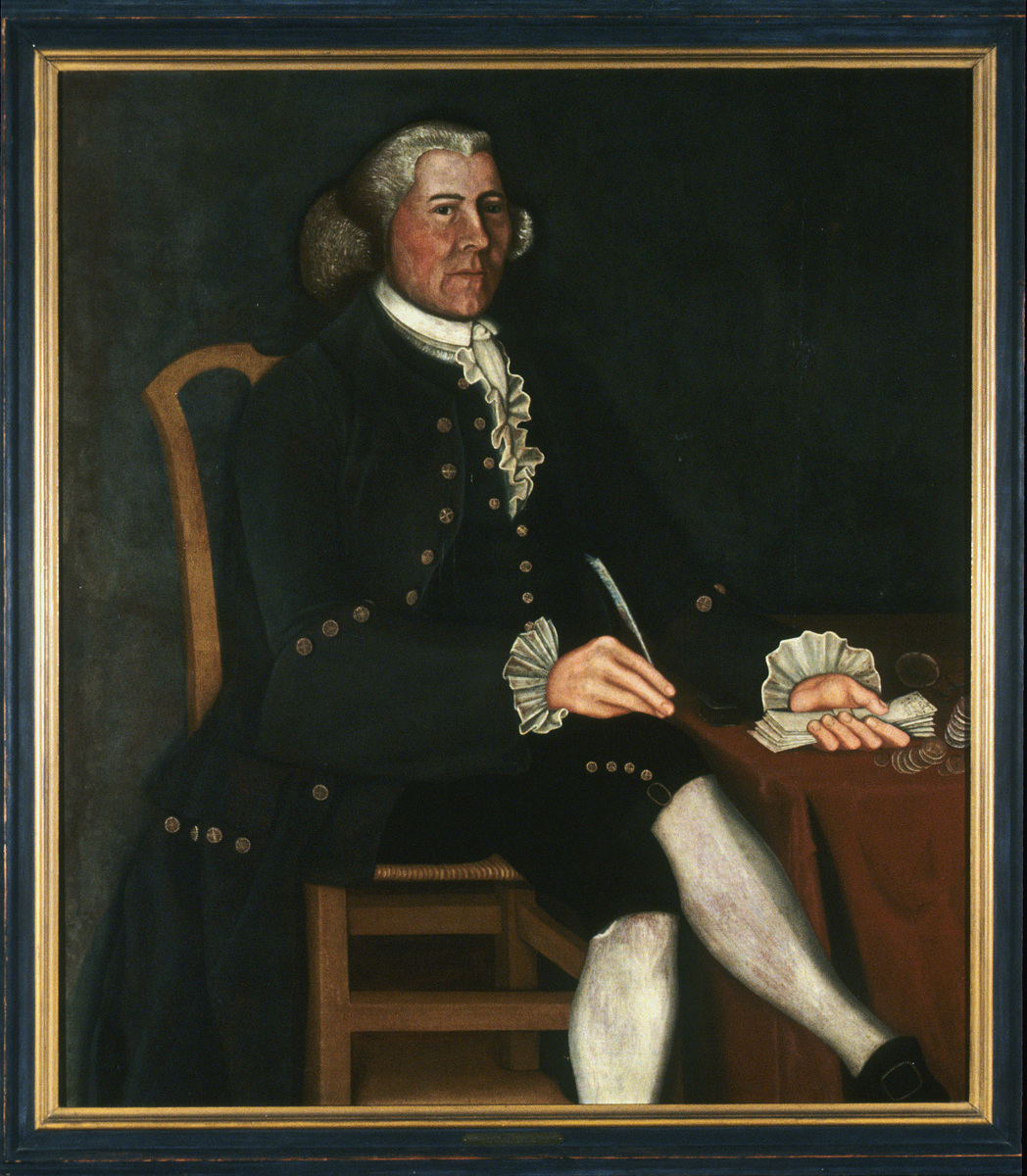
- portrait by Winthrop Chandler
- Born: January 4, 1730
- Died: October 17, 1807 (aged 77)
- Children: James McClellan

Samuel McClellan (January 4, 1730 – October 17, 1807) was an American merchant and farmer in Woodstock, Connecticut, and a brigadier general in the American Revolutionary War.

Born in Worcester, Massachusetts, of Ulster Scots descent, McClellan served as Ensign and Lieutenant in the French and Indian War and was wounded in battle. Upon his return from the provincial campaign, he bought a farm in Woodstock and settled there. He later engaged in mercantile business and established an extensive trade, importing goods and supplying neighboring merchants.

When the American Revolution put a stop to his trade, he trained and equipped the county militia. In 1773, a troop of horse was raised in Woodstock, Killingly, and Pomfret, Connecticut, of which he became commander.

In 1775, Major Samuel McClellan led 184 men at the Battles of Lexington and Concord. He played a prominent role in the Battle of Bunker Hill, and after achieving the rank of lieutenant colonel in 1776, colonel in 1777, and brigadier general of the 5th Brigade in 1779, his regiment of the Connecticut Militia was stationed near New Jersey. McClellan was solicited by General George Washington to join the Continental Army and was offered a commission, but his domestic and business affairs compelled him to refuse.

After the Battle of Groton Heights, and the invasion and burning of New London, Connecticut, McClellan was appointed to oversee troops stationed at those points and continued the command until the close of the war, acting as commissary in the purchase and forwarding of provisions for the army when not otherwise in active service.

Shortly after the war, he returned to Woodstock and was elected to the State Assembly. He was known to many, including his grandson, George McClellan, and great-grandson George B. McClellan (a Major General during the American Civil War), as "General Sam." Samuel's sons James and John founded the Woodstock Academy in 1801, and his grandson George McClellan founded the Jefferson Medical College.

On November 16, 1757, in Killingly, Connecticut, McClellan married firstly Jemima Chandler (born 1734). She died in 1764, and on March 5, 1766, he married secondly Rachel Abbe, a descendant of Plymouth Governor William Bradford. He is buried in Woodstock, Connecticut.
