= George McClellan (anatomy professor) =

Professor of anatomy

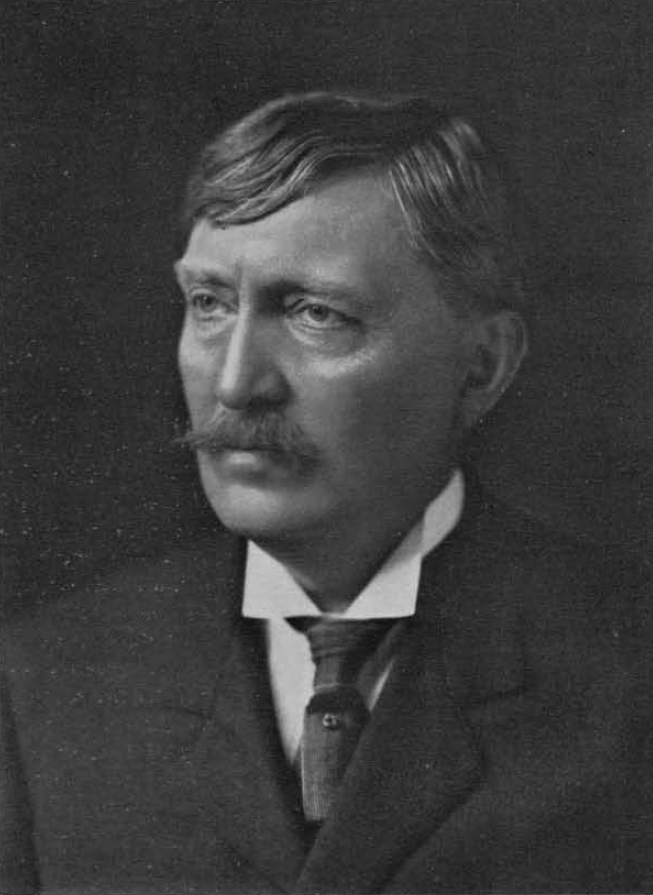
- Dr. McClellan in 1913
- Born: October 29, 1849; Philadelphia, Pennsylvania, U.S
- Died: March 29, 1913 (aged 63); Philadelphia, Pennsylvania, U.S
- Education: University of Pennsylvania (1865-1868) (withdrew)
- Alma mater: Jefferson Medical College
- Occupation: Doctor
- Years active: 1870-1913
- Employer(s): Howard Hospital (early 1870s); Philadelphia General Hospital (mid-1870s); St. Joseph's Hospital (mid-1870s - 1879); Pennsylvania School of Anatomy (1881-1893); Pennsylvania Academy of Fine Arts (1893-1913)
- Known for: Anatomy
- Notable work: Regional Anatomy in Its Relation to Medicine and Surgery (1892)
- Relatives: George B. McClellan (uncle); George McClellan (grandfather)

George McClellan, M.D. (October 29, 1849 – March 29, 1913) was an American medical doctor and anatomist known for his anatomical drawings. He is the grandson of George McClellan, also a doctor.

== Early life and education ==
George McClellan was born in Philadelphia on October 29, 1849. He attended the University of Pennsylvania for undergraduate study, beginning in 1865; however, in 1868 he left the University of Pennsylvania during his senior year in order to begin medical school at Jefferson Medical College. During medical school, McClellan was a clinical assistant to Joseph Pancoast and Samuel D. Gross. McClellan graduated from Jefferson Medical College in 1870.

== Career ==
After medical school, McClellan pursued a career as a general surgeon. He was appointed surgeon first at Howard Hospital, then Philadelphia General Hospital and later St. Joseph's Hospital. His was widely known for his medical work Regional Anatomy in Its Relation to Medicine and Surgery in which McClellan made his own photographs from his own dissections and completed the illustrations himself. The book went through four editions in the United States, selling over 15,000 copies.

McClellan founded the Pennsylvania School of Anatomy and Surgery where he gave lectures from 1881-1893, and taught artistic anatomy at the Pennsylvania Academy of Fine Arts for the last 23 years of his life. His anatomical expertise was recognized by Jefferson Medical College in his 1906 appointment as chair of the applied anatomy department. George McClellan died at his home in Philadelphia, Pennsylvania on March 29, 1913.
