= George McClellan (physician) =

American surgeon (1796–1847)

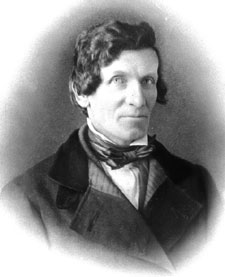
- McClellan in 1845
- Born: December 22, 1796; Woodstock, Connecticut, U.S.
- Died: May 9, 1847 (aged 50); Philadelphia, Pennsylvania, U.S.
- Burial place: Laurel Hill Cemetery, Philadelphia, Pennsylvania, U.S.
- Education: Yale College; University of Pennsylvania School of Medicine
- Spouse: Elizabeth Brinton
- Children: 5 (including George)
- Parent(s): James McClellan; Eunice Eldredge
- Relatives: Samuel McClellan (grandfather); George McClellan (grandson)

George McClellan (December 22, 1796 – May 9, 1847) was an American surgeon. He founded the Jefferson Medical College and the Medical Department of Pennsylvania College, and was known for his pioneering work in surgery, including writing a widely used textbook.

== Life and work ==
McClellan was born on December 22, 1796, in Woodstock, Connecticut, to Eunice (Eldredge) and James McClellan. His family was of Scottish and English ancestry. His great-grandfather fought on the Jacobite side in the Battle of Culloden, the last pitched battle in Britain, before immigrating to Worcester, Massachusetts. George McClellan's grandfather, Samuel McClellan was a brigadier general in the American Revolutionary War. Through his father, he was also a descendant of Plymouth, Massachusetts Governor William Bradford.

Throughout his life, George McClellan had a good memory for names and faces of virtually everyone he met. One former student recalled a brief meeting with the doctor and then being recognized even one year later, stating, "the moment we entered Doctor McClellan's office, he recognized and named each one of us, although he had seen us only once before, a year back, and only a very short time." However, Darrach wrote, "McClellan had his peculiarities." He often came across as disrespectful and even insubordinate and spoke in a "rapid incoherent manner." It has been noted that he routinely perturbed individuals above him in title. Nonetheless, some people just accepted this as something that came with his "surgical zeal."

McClellan's famous family includes his wife, Elizabeth (Brinton), two sons, John Hill Brinton McClellan, who was a physician, and the other, General George Brinton McClellan, who was a major general during the American Civil War. His grandson, George McClellan (1849–1913) became the Chair of Anatomy at Jefferson Medical College and authored the famous medical text, Regional Anatomy.

George McClellan died early in the morning on May 9, 1847, from exsanguination due to an ulcerated lesion below the sigmoid flexure of the colon. He was interred at Laurel Hill Cemetery, Philadelphia.

== Career ==
McClellan entered into the sophomore class at Yale at the age of sixteen and excelled in mathematics and published natural sciences articles in the American Journal of Science. In 1815, at age 18, he obtained his baccalaureate degree. He then took up the study of medicine, first with Thomas Hubbard of Pomfret, Connecticut, later Professor of Surgery of the Medical College of New Haven, with whom he remained one year. In 1817, he went to Philadelphia to attend medical lectures at the University of Pennsylvania, and to become the private pupil of John Syng Dorsey, Professor of Materia Medica, receiving his Doctor of Medicine degree in 1819.

=== Founder of medical schools ===
George McClellan gave a series of private anatomy lectures before deciding to found a new medical school. Many unsuccessful requests had already been made for a new medical school in Philadelphia so he and others had the idea to couple it with Jefferson College in Canonsburg, Pennsylvania. With this in mind, the group made a request to the Legislature of Pennsylvania in 1824, and in 1825, received a charter for what was to become Jefferson Medical College. With the "highly regarded" University of Pennsylvania School of Medicine already being in Philadelphia, it was considered "professional heresy" to open a second school, but McClellan thought that opening a second medical school would just lead to more students going to Philadelphia to study medicine. Because of this, physicians at that time noted that he had to choose instructors "greatly inferior in talent to himself" and it was not a sure thing that the school would survive. The Jefferson Medical College opened in 1826, in Philadelphia, and in 1836 had an entering class of 360 medical students nonetheless and McClellan lectured in surgery. In 1838, Jefferson College separated from Jefferson Medical College, and all instructors, including McClellan, were vacated and the trustees hired all new individuals to teach. This change, unrelated to McClellan's leaving, led the school came to be considered a "legitimate" medical school.

For his next project, McClellan opened The Medical Department of Pennsylvania College with Samuel Colhoun, William Rush, and Samuel George Morton in Philadelphia, giving the first course of lectures in November 1839. Due to monetary circumstances, the four men resigned their professorships in 1843. In 1858, the school planned to merge with the Philadelphia College of Medicine, but that school closed the next year in 1859. 1861 saw the Medical Department of Pennsylvania College close due to unpaid bills and low enrollment secondary to the American Civil War. Nonetheless, his extended medical education system (referring to more years spent in school than the standard 2 to 3 at the time) became widely accepted and spread among schools.

=== As a teacher ===
Even before founding Jefferson Medical College, McClellan was regarded as a great teacher, with his colleague, William Darrach, stating, "[a] teacher so qualified will attract pupils." He had added an anatomy and surgery teaching room next to his office and lectured nightly to students of his medical classes.

Before, and while at Jefferson, McClellan had a successful lectureship in surgery until 1838 when Jefferson College separated from Jefferson Medical College and the teaching positions were all vacated. He then went on to teach at the new school he co-founded.

=== As a surgeon ===
McClellan was an accomplished and famous surgeon, leading to Samuel George Morton summing up what many of his contemporaries thought of him in a memorandum from March 8, 1845:

The day before yesterday I was present at an operation performed by Dr. George McClellan, on a gentleman from Virginia. It consisted in the removal of the whole of the parotid gland in a scirrhous and much enlarged state, from the left side of the face. Nothing could exceed the combined coolness and skill manifested by Dr. M. throughout this terrible operation, which he has now performed for the eleventh time, and hitherto with remarkable success. On this occasion, however, he was doomed to disappointment, for the patient died last night, about thirty-six hours after the operation. McClellan sent for me in the evening, to see the dying man with him, and we met in the chamber of death between ten and eleven o'clock. I had sometimes heard McClellan spoken of as a heartless surgeon, devoid of feeling or sympathy for those who came under his knife; but I can solemnly aver that I have seldom witnessed more unaffected sorrow than he manifested on this occasion. He walked the room incessantly, and repeatedly clasped my hands in his, while he expressed, in emphatic language, the feelings that preyed upon his mind. He moreover assured me, that he seldom performed one of his severer operations without first asking the blessing of God on his undertaking; and that days and nights of painful anxiety, often preceded those great professional efforts which have justly placed his name on the pinnacle of surgical fame. The gurgling respiration of the unfortunate patient announced the near approach of death, and I withdrew, full of sympathy for the agonized emotions of my friend.

His name became widespread and he was known to have performed more surgeries than any other during his lifetime. His fame led him to operate on patients from the United States, but he also attracted patients from Europe, the West Indies, and South America, especially for operations in ophthalmic surgery. McClellan was one of the first surgeons to perform a lens extraction, and was the first American to perform many operations, including the removal of the parotid gland.

Expertise led to his contributing to the American Medical Review and Journal, editing textbooks, and writing a widely used surgery textbook, The Principles and Practice of Surgery. The book was left as a manuscript in 1847, but was edited by his son John H. B. McClellan and published the following year.
