= George B. McClellan =

American major general (1826–1885)

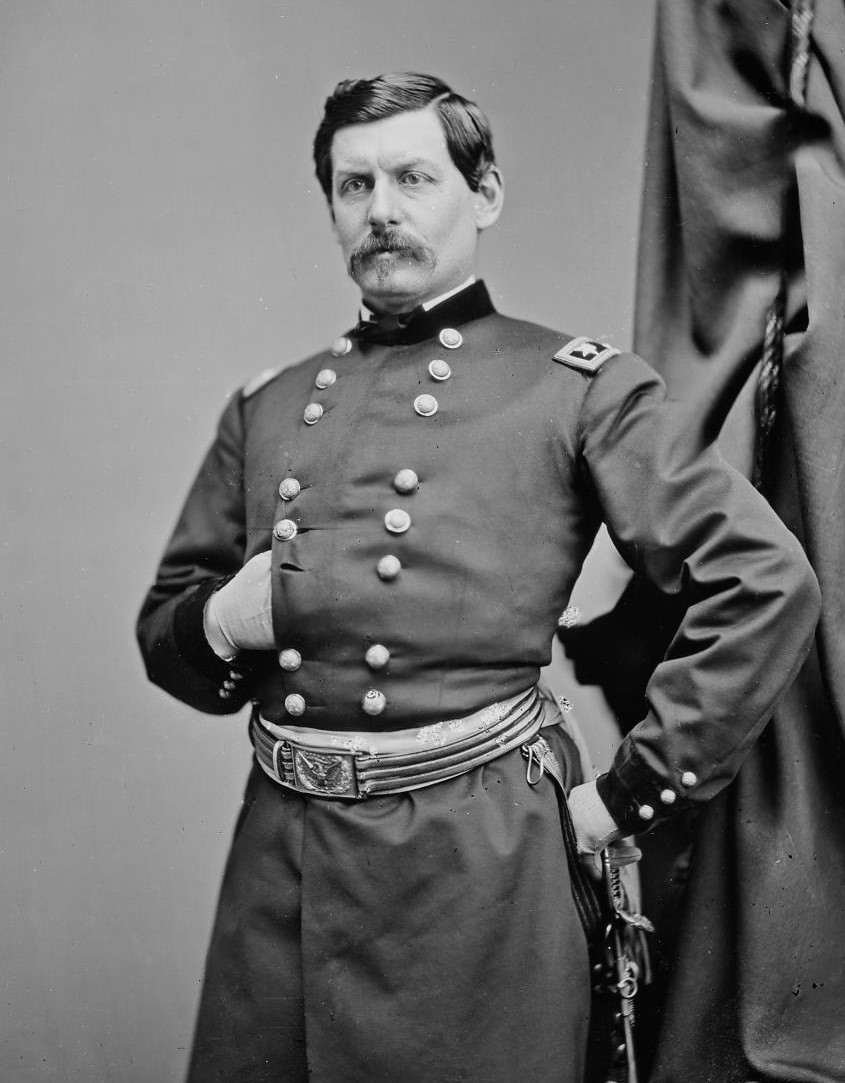
- Portrait by Mathew Benjamin Brady, 1861

24th Governor of New Jersey
- In office January 15, 1878 – January 18, 1881
- Preceded by: Joseph D. Bedle
- Succeeded by: George C. Ludlow

Commanding General of the U.S. Army
- In office November 1, 1861 – March 11, 1862
- President: Abraham Lincoln
- Preceded by: Winfield Scott
- Succeeded by: Edwin Stanton

Personal details
- Born: George Brinton McClellan; December 3, 1826 Philadelphia, Pennsylvania, U.S.
- Died: October 29, 1885 (aged 58) West Orange, New Jersey, U.S.
- Resting place: Riverview Cemetery
- Party: Democratic
- Spouse: Ellen Mary Marcy (m. 1860)
- Children: Mary McClellan and George B. McClellan Jr.
- Parents: George McClellan; Elizabeth Sophia Steinmetz Brinton
- Education: University of Pennsylvania; United States Military Academy (BS)
- Nicknames: Little Mac; The Young Napoleon; The Little Napoleon

Military service
- Allegiance: United States (Union)
- Branch/service: United States Army
- Years of service: 1846–1857; 1861–1864
- Rank: Major General
- Commands: Department of the Ohio; Army of the Potomac
- Battles/wars: Mexican-American War; Siege of Veracruz; Battle of Cerro Gordo; Battle of Contreras; Battle of Churubusco; Battle of Chapultepec; Crimean War (observer); American Civil War; Western Virginia campaign; Battle of Rich Mountain; Battle of Corrick's Ford; Peninsula Campaign; Battle of Yorktown; Battle of Williamsburg; Battle of Seven Pines; Seven Days Battles; Maryland campaign; Battle of South Mountain; Battle of Antietam

George Brinton McClellan (December 3, 1826 – October 29, 1885) was an American military officer, politician, and engineer who served as the 24th governor of New Jersey from 1878 to 1881, as Commanding General of the United States Army from November 1861 to March 1862, and the unsuccessful Democratic Party candidate in the 1864 presidential election. He was also chief engineer and vice president of the Illinois Central Railroad, and later president of the Ohio and Mississippi Railroad in 1860.

A West Point graduate, McClellan served with distinction during the Mexican-American War. He was a railway executive and engineer until the outbreak of the American Civil War in 1861. Early in the conflict, McClellan was appointed to the rank of major general and played an important role in raising the Army of the Potomac, which served in the Eastern Theater.

McClellan organized and led the Union Army in the Peninsula campaign in southeastern Virginia from March through July 1862. It was the first large-scale offensive in the Eastern Theater. Making an amphibious clockwise turning movement around the Confederate Army in northern Virginia, McClellan's forces turned west to move up the Virginia Peninsula, between the James River and York River, landing from Chesapeake Bay, with the Confederate capital of Richmond as their objective. Initially, McClellan was somewhat successful against General Joseph E. Johnston, but the emergence of General Robert E. Lee to command the Army of Northern Virginia turned the subsequent Seven Days Battles into a Union defeat. However, historians note that Lee's victory was in many ways pyrrhic as he failed to destroy the Army of the Potomac and suffered a bloody repulse at Malvern Hill.

McClellan and President Abraham Lincoln developed a mutual distrust, and McClellan was privately derisive of Lincoln. He was removed from command in November, in the aftermath of the 1862 midterm elections. A major contributing factor in this decision was McClellan's failure to pursue Lee's army following the tactically inconclusive but strategic Union victory at the Battle of Antietam outside Sharpsburg, Maryland. He never received another field command and went on to become the unsuccessful Democratic Party nominee in the 1864 presidential election against Lincoln. The effectiveness of his campaign was damaged when McClellan repudiated his party's platform, which promised an end to the war and negotiations with the Confederacy. He served as the governor of New Jersey from 1878 to 1881; in McClellan's later writings, he vigorously defended his Civil War conduct.

== Early life and education ==
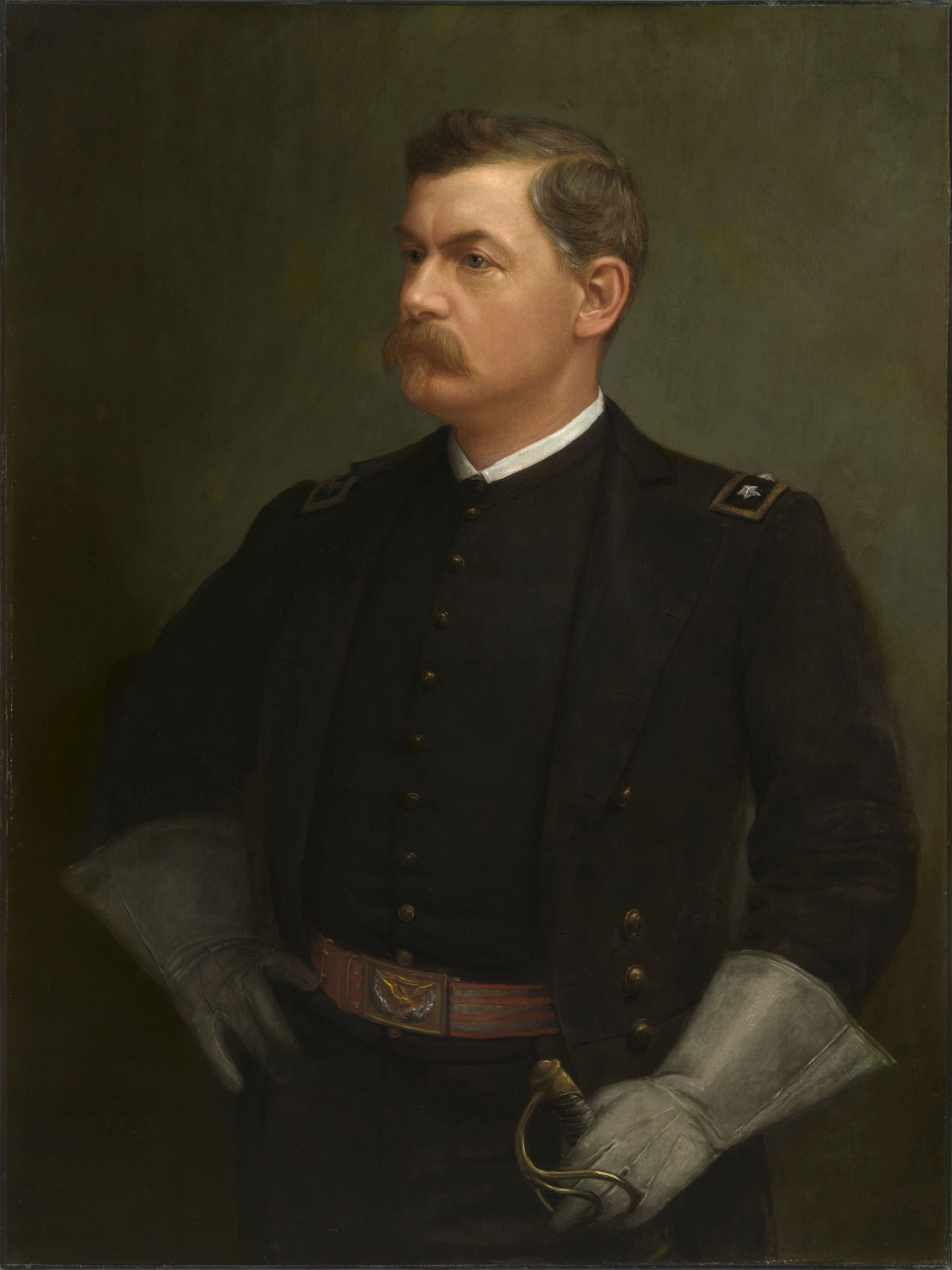
The Julian Scott portrait of McClellan in the National Portrait Gallery in Washington, D.C.

George Brinton McClellan was born in Philadelphia on December 3, 1826, a son of surgeon George McClellan, who founded Jefferson Medical College. His father's family was of Scottish and English heritage. His mother was Elizabeth Sophia Steinmetz Brinton McClellan, a woman noted for her "considerable grace and refinement." Her father was of English origin, while her mother was Pennsylvania Dutch. The couple had five children: Frederica, John, George, Arthur, and Mary. One of McClellan's great-grandfathers was Samuel McClellan, a brigadier general who served during the American Revolutionary War.

McClellan initially intended to follow his father into the medical profession, and attended a private academy, which was followed by enrollment in a private preparatory school for the University of Pennsylvania. He began attending the university in 1840, when he was 14 years old, resigning himself to the study of law after his family decided that medical educations for both McClellan and his older brother John were too expensive. After two years at the university, he changed his goal to military service. With the assistance of his father's letter to President John Tyler, McClellan was accepted at the United States Military Academy in 1842 at the age of 15, with the academy waiving its usual minimum age of 16.

At West Point, he was an energetic and ambitious cadet, deeply interested in the teachings of Dennis Hart Mahan and the theoretical strategic principles of Antoine-Henri Jomini. His closest friends were aristocratic southerners including George Pickett, Dabney Maury, Cadmus Wilcox, and A. P. Hill. These associations gave McClellan what he considered to be an appreciation of the southern mind and an understanding of the political and military implications of the sectional differences in the United States that led to the Civil War. He graduated at age 19 in 1846, second in his class of 59 cadets, losing the top position to Charles Seaforth Stewart only because of inferior drawing skills. He was commissioned a brevet second lieutenant in the U.S. Army Corps of Engineers.

== Career ==
=== Mexican-American War 1846–1848 ===
McClellan's first assignment was with a company of engineers formed at West Point, but he quickly received orders to sail for the Mexican War. He arrived near the mouth of the Rio Grande in October 1846, well prepared for action with a double-barreled shotgun, two pistols, a saber, a dress sword, and a Bowie knife. He complained that he had arrived too late to take any part in the American victory at Monterrey in September. During a temporary armistice in which the forces of Gen. Zachary Taylor awaited action, McClellan was stricken with dysentery and malaria, which kept him in the hospital for nearly a month. Malaria would recur in later years; he called it his "Mexican disease." He served as an engineering officer during the war, was frequently subject to enemy fire, and was appointed a brevet first lieutenant for his services at Contreras and Churubusco and to captain for his service at Chapultepec. He performed reconnaissance missions for Maj. Gen. Winfield Scott, a close friend of McClellan's father. As a lieutenant he also served under Captain Robert E. Lee, who he would later face at the Battle of Antietam during the Civil War. He cultivated a mentorship with Joseph E. Johnston, a close associate of his. Their bond was marked by mutual respect and support, especially during pivotal wartime events like the Battle of Seven Pines. Even with their professional competition, their camaraderie significantly influenced their military tactics and personal connections throughout the conflict.

McClellan's experiences in the war would shape his military and political life. He learned that flanking movements (used by Scott at Cerro Gordo) were often better than frontal assaults, and the value of siege operations (Veracruz). He witnessed Scott's success in balancing political with military affairs and his good relations with the civil population as he invaded, enforcing strict discipline on his soldiers to minimize damage to property. McClellan also developed a disdain for volunteer soldiers and officers, particularly politicians who cared nothing for discipline and training.

=== Peacetime service ===
McClellan returned to West Point to command his engineering company, which was attached to the academy for the purpose of training cadets in engineering activities. He chafed at the boredom of peacetime garrison service, although he greatly enjoyed the social life. In June 1851, he was ordered to Fort Delaware, a masonry work under construction on an island in the Delaware River, forty miles (65 km) downriver from Philadelphia. In March 1852, he was ordered to report to Capt. Randolph B. Marcy at Fort Smith, Arkansas, to serve as second-in-command on an expedition to discover the sources of the Red River. By June the expedition reached the source of the north fork of the river and Marcy named a small tributary McClellan's Creek. Upon their return on July 28, they were astonished to find that they had been given up for dead. A sensational story had reached the press that the expedition had been ambushed by 2,000 Comanches and killed to the last man. McClellan blamed the story on "a set of scoundrels, who seek to keep up agitation on the frontier in order to get employment from the Govt. in one way or other."

In the fall of 1852, McClellan published a manual on bayonet tactics that he had translated from the original French. He also received an assignment to the Department of Texas, with orders to perform a survey of Texas rivers and harbors. In 1853, he participated in the Pacific Railroad surveys, ordered by Secretary of War Jefferson Davis, to select an appropriate route for the planned transcontinental railroad. McClellan surveyed the western portion of the northern corridor along the 47th and 49th parallels from Saint Paul, Minnesota, to the Puget Sound. During the survey, he demonstrated a tendency for insubordination toward senior political figures. Isaac Stevens, governor of the Washington Territory, became dissatisfied with McClellan's performance in his scouting of passes across the Cascade Range.

McClellan selected Yakima Pass (47.3365°N 121.4324°W) without a thorough reconnaissance and refused the governor's order to lead a party through it in winter conditions, relying on faulty intelligence about the depth of snowpack in that area. In so doing, he missed three greatly superior passes in the near vicinity, which were eventually used for railroads and interstate highways. The governor ordered McClellan to turn over his expedition logbooks, but McClellan steadfastly refused, most likely because of embarrassing personal comments that he had made throughout his adventures.

Returning to the East, McClellan began courting his future wife, Ellen Mary Marcy (1836–1915), the daughter of his former commander. Ellen, or Nelly, refused McClellan's first proposal of marriage, one of nine that she received from a variety of suitors, including his West Point friend, A. P. Hill. Ellen accepted Hill's proposal in 1856, but her family did not approve and he withdrew.

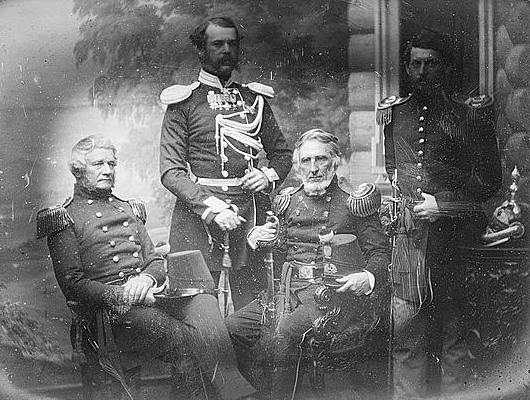
The Delafield Commission in Russia, c. 1855. Left to right: Alfred Mordecai, Lt. Colonel Obrescoff (Russian escort), Richard Delafield, and McClellan.

In June 1854, McClellan was sent on a secret reconnaissance mission to Santo Domingo at the behest of Jefferson Davis. McClellan assessed local defensive capabilities for the secretary; the information was not used until 1870 when President Ulysses S. Grant unsuccessfully attempted to annex the Dominican Republic. Davis was beginning to treat McClellan almost as a protégé, and his next assignment was to assess the logistical readiness of various railroads in the United States, once again with an eye toward planning for the transcontinental railroad. In March 1855, McClellan was promoted to captain and assigned to the 1st U.S. Cavalry regiment.

Due to his political connections and his mastery of French, McClellan received the assignment to be an official observer of the European armies in the Crimean War in 1855 as part of the Delafield Commission, led by Richard Delafield. Traveling widely, and interacting with the highest military commands and royal families, McClellan observed the siege of Sevastopol. Upon his return to the United States in 1856, he requested an assignment in Philadelphia to prepare his report, which contained a critical analysis of the siege and a lengthy description of the organization of the European armies. He also wrote a manual on cavalry tactics that was based on Russian cavalry regulations. Like other observers, though, McClellan did not appreciate the importance of the emergence of rifled muskets in the Crimean War, and the fundamental changes in warfare tactics it would require.

The Army adopted McClellan's cavalry manual and also his design for a saddle, dubbed the McClellan Saddle, which he claimed to have seen used by Hussars in Prussia and Hungary. It became standard issue for as long as the U.S. horse cavalry existed and is still used for ceremonies.

=== Civilian pursuits ===
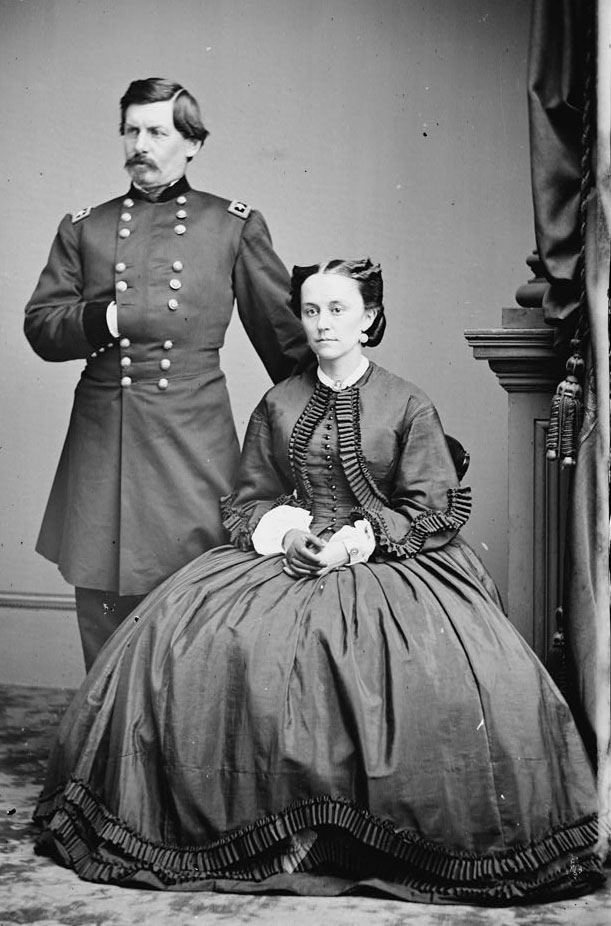
McClellan and Ellen Mary "Nelly" (Marcy) McClellan

McClellan resigned his commission January 16, 1857, and, capitalizing on his experience with railroad assessment, became chief engineer and vice president of the Illinois Central Railroad, and then president of the Ohio and Mississippi Railroad in 1860. He performed well in both jobs, expanding the Illinois Central toward New Orleans and helping the Ohio and Mississippi recover from the Panic of 1857. Despite his successes and lucrative salary ($10,000 per year), he was frustrated with civilian employment and continued to study classical military strategy assiduously. During the Utah War against the Mormons, he considered rejoining the Army. He also considered service as a filibuster in support of Benito Juárez in Mexico.

Before the outbreak of the Civil War, McClellan became active in politics, supporting the presidential campaign of Democrat Stephen A. Douglas in the 1860 election. He claimed to have defeated an attempt at vote fraud by Republicans by ordering the delay of a train that was carrying men to vote illegally in another county, enabling Douglas to win the county.

In October 1859, McClellan was able to resume his courtship of Ellen Mary. They were married in Calvary Church, New York City, on May 22, 1860.

== Civil War ==
=== Ohio ===
At the start of the Civil War in 1861, McClellan's knowledge of what was called "big war science" and his railroad experience suggested he might excel at military logistics. His old report from his tour in the Crimean war was quickly rushed for publication. This placed him in great demand as the Union mobilized its militia and its armies. The governors of Ohio, Pennsylvania, and New York, the three largest states of the Union, actively pursued him to command their states' militia. McClellan expressed desire to command the state militia of his home state of Pennsylvania, but when the dispatch did not arrive to him as early as he expected it, he departed Illinois for Pennsylvania with the intent of commanding its state militia. On his way there, he stopped at Columbus to discuss the military situation in the Ohio valley with Ohio governor William Dennison. Dennison was impressed with McClellan and offered him command of the state militia on the spot, which he accepted. Pennsylvania's governor had in fact already sent a wire to McClellan offering him command of the Pennsylvania state militia, but he did not receive this until the next day. McClellan was commissioned a major general of volunteers and took command of the Ohio militia on April 23, 1861. Unlike some of his fellow Union officers who came from abolitionist families, he was opposed to federal interference with slavery. For this reason, some of his Southern colleagues approached him informally about siding with the Confederacy, but he could not accept the concept of secession.

On May 3 McClellan re-entered federal service as commander of the Department of the Ohio, responsible for the defense of the states of Ohio, Indiana, Illinois, and, later, western Pennsylvania, western Virginia, and Missouri. On May 14, he was commissioned a major general in the regular army. At age 34, he outranked everyone in the Army except Lt. Gen. Winfield Scott, the general-in-chief. McClellan's rapid promotion was partly due to his acquaintance with Secretary of the Treasury Salmon P. Chase, who was formerly an Ohio governor and senator.

As McClellan scrambled to process the thousands of men who were volunteering for service and to set up training camps, he also applied his mind to grand strategy. He wrote a letter to Gen. Scott on April 27, four days after assuming command in Ohio, that presented the first proposal for a strategy for the war. It contained two alternatives, each envisioning a prominent role for himself as commander. The first would use 80,000 men to invade Virginia through the Kanawha Valley toward Richmond. The second would use the same force to drive south instead, crossing the Ohio River into Kentucky and Tennessee. Scott rejected both plans as logistically unfeasible. Although he complimented McClellan and expressed his "great confidence in your intelligence, zeal, science, and energy", he replied by letter that the 80,000 men would be better used on a river-based expedition to control the Mississippi River and split the Confederacy, accompanied by a strong Union blockade of Southern ports. This plan, which would require considerable patience of the Northern public, was derided in newspapers as the Anaconda Plan, but eventually proved to be the outline of the successful prosecution of the war. Relations between the two generals became increasingly strained over the summer and fall.

=== Western Virginia ===
Governor Dennison encouraged and pressured McClellan to conduct offensive operations in northwestern Virginia, where unionist sentiment was strong and western Virginians were clamoring for secession from eastern Virginia. Dennison's office was barraged by many letters from northwestern Virginians requesting military occupation of northwestern Virginia to protect from potential reprisals from secessionists. McClellan's first military operations were to occupy the area of western Virginia that wanted to remain in the Union and subsequently became the state of West Virginia. He had received intelligence reports on May 26 that the critical Baltimore and Ohio Railroad bridges in that portion of the state were being burned. He quickly implemented plans to invade the region. Confederate general George A. Porterfield was in charge of defending western Virginia with most of the rebel forces based at Grafton. McClellan triggered his first serious political controversy by proclaiming to the citizens there that his forces had no intentions of interfering with personal property—including slaves. "Notwithstanding all that has been said by the traitors to induce you to believe that our advent among you will be signalized by interference with your slaves, understand one thing clearly—not only will we abstain from all such interference but we will on the contrary with an iron hand, crush any attempted insurrection on their part." He quickly realized that he had overstepped his bounds and apologized by letter to President Lincoln. The controversy was not that his proclamation was diametrically opposed to the administration's policy at the time, but that he was so bold in stepping beyond his strictly military role.

As his forces moved rapidly into West Virginia across the Beverly-Fairmont turnpike towards Grafton, Confederate forces under the command of General Porterfield retreated quickly before McClellan's superior forces towards Philippi, where Porterfield ordered his forces into a momentary rest before continuing the retreat. McClellan planned to encircle Porterfield's command at Philippi through a complex plan that required coordination between three separate forces. This coordination failed, and the bombardment of the village commenced with a false signal. The Confederates at Philippi were completely routed, but they did not retreat towards a prepared line of Union troops as the plan originally envisioned. This was the first land conflict of the war. McClellan then split his forces up, one column went under the command of general Thomas A. Morris, marched to the Beverly–Fairmont turnpike to attack Confederate troops defending Laurel Mountain, who were under command of Confederate general Robert S. Garnett, and secure the northern road leading to the valley east of the mountains. This force beset the rebels at Laurel Mountain on July 7. His first personal command in battle was at Rich Mountain, where McClellan was plagued by hesitation and his erroneous idea that he was facing a sizeable Confederate force. McClellan wished to flank the strong Confederate position at Rich Mountain but found no avenue to do so, and ordered his forces into a preliminary siege. A young boy from the Hart family, whose house was on Rich Mountain, behind the Confederate position, a family with unionist sympathies, walked into McClellan's camp and offered to show the Union troops a route through the woods around the Confederate left, this small trail would eventually turn north and link up with the Buckhannon-Beverly pike that cut through Rich Mountain eastwards to the valley, and then to Cheat River. McClellan was pleased and ordered his subordinate, Colonel William S. Rosecrans, to lead a contingent of troops, flank the Confederates and take them by surprise. Due to intense rain, a movement that was originally estimated to take an hour or two at most, took more than seven hours.

After a long time without receiving news from Rosecrans, McClellan grew nervous and dispatched an order to call off this attack, but the orders never reached Rosecrans. Finally, after an exhausting march, Rosecrans took up positions south of the Hart home and launched a vigorous attack up the hill to the Hart farm. Confederate troops, who were under the overall command of general John Pegram, attempted a defense and moved two guns to the road to repulse this attack, which was well east of the main Confederate position on Rich Mountain. Another regiment was ordered out of Beverly to link up with the Confederate position at Rich Mountain, this regiment had arrived too late and found the Union troops had overrun the road, captured a Confederate cannon and were holding the road between Beverly and the Confederate troops west of their position on Rich Mountain (behind the rebel defensive line). McClellan heard the sounds of battle from his headquarters but being unsure and nervous, ordered no attack on the mountain. The next day the demoralized Confederate troops retreated from Rich Mountain through trails that took them northwards and then attempted to move eastwards back to Beverly on the Tygart valley. A harrowing pursuit caused several hundred, including Pegram, to surrender next day, and the battle of Rich Mountain ended in a decisive Union victory. Confederate troops 15 km north-west, defending Laurel Mountain on the Beverely-Fairmont turnpike, retreated in great disorder after hearing of the rebel defeat on Rich Mountain. McClellan in his later report severely criticized Morris for his purported late pursuit of the Confederates after their retreat from there, even though he had extensively instructed Morris earlier to be very cautious and wary in his advance against enemy forces. Rosecrans bitterly complained that his attack on Rich Mountain was not reinforced as McClellan had agreed.

McClellan was obliged to absorb all credit for the victory at Rich Mountain, and lent no credit to Rosecrans' performance during the battle. These victories propelled McClellan to the status of national hero. The New York Herald entitled an article about him "Gen. McClellan, the Napoleon of the Present War". After the defeat of Confederate forces at Rich Mountain and Laurel Mountain, Union troops sharply pursued them eastwards across the Tygart Valley all the way to Cheat River & Cheat Mountain. Confederate general Garnett was killed in a rearguard action on Cheat River at Corrick's ford by Morris' force, and thus Confederate presence had been completely ejected from West Virginia, although Confederate troops were still present in Kanawha under the command of Henry A. Wise and John Floyd. McClellan proceeded to bombastically proclaim that secessionist presence in West Virginia had been completely crushed. McClellan organized a defensive network of the region spanning Cheat Mountain, Allegheny Mountain all the way to Gauley Bridge in Kanawha. McClellan chose Rosecrans as his successor and briefed him on the situation before departing for Washington upon being summoned to reorganize the routed Union Army of Northeastern Virginia after the defeat at Bull Run.

=== Building an army ===
After the defeat of the Union forces at Bull Run on July 21, 1861, Lincoln summoned McClellan from western Virginia, where McClellan had given the North the only engagements bearing a semblance of victory. He traveled by special train on the main Pennsylvania line from Wheeling through Pittsburgh, Philadelphia, and Baltimore, and on to Washington, D.C., and was greeted by enthusiastic crowds that met his train along the way.

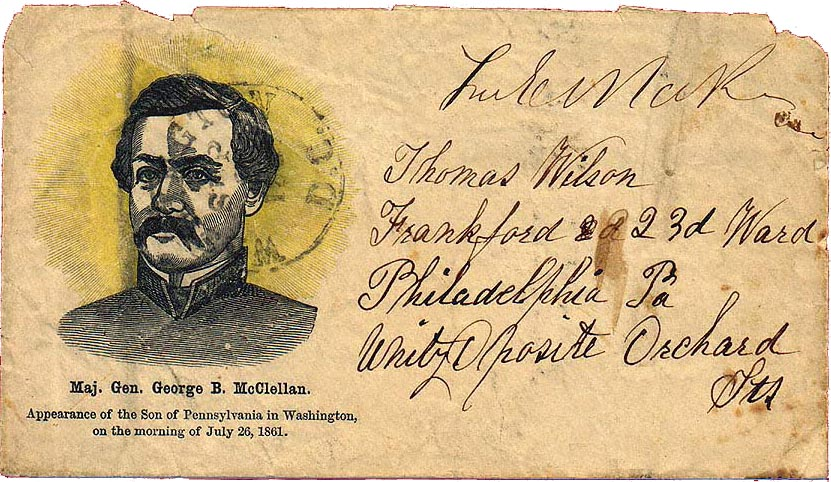
Patriotic cover honoring the arrival of McClellan in Washington, D.C., on July 26, 1861

Carl Sandburg wrote, "McClellan was the man of the hour, pointed to by events, and chosen by an overwhelming weight of public and private opinion." On July 26, the day he reached the capital, McClellan was appointed commander of the Military Division of the Potomac, the main Union force responsible for the defense of Washington. On August 20, several military units in Virginia were consolidated into his department and he immediately formed the Army of the Potomac, with himself as its first commander. This Army became the primary force in the Union army in the Eastern Theatre that protected the Capital and the North. He reveled in his newly acquired power and influence:

I find myself in a new and strange position here—Presdt, Cabinet, Genl Scott & all deferring to me—by some strange operation of magic I seem to have become the power of the land. ... I almost think that were I to win some small success now I could become Dictator or anything else that might please me—but nothing of that kind would please me—therefore I won't be Dictator. Admirable self-denial!

— George B. McClellan, letter to his wife Ellen, July 26, 1861

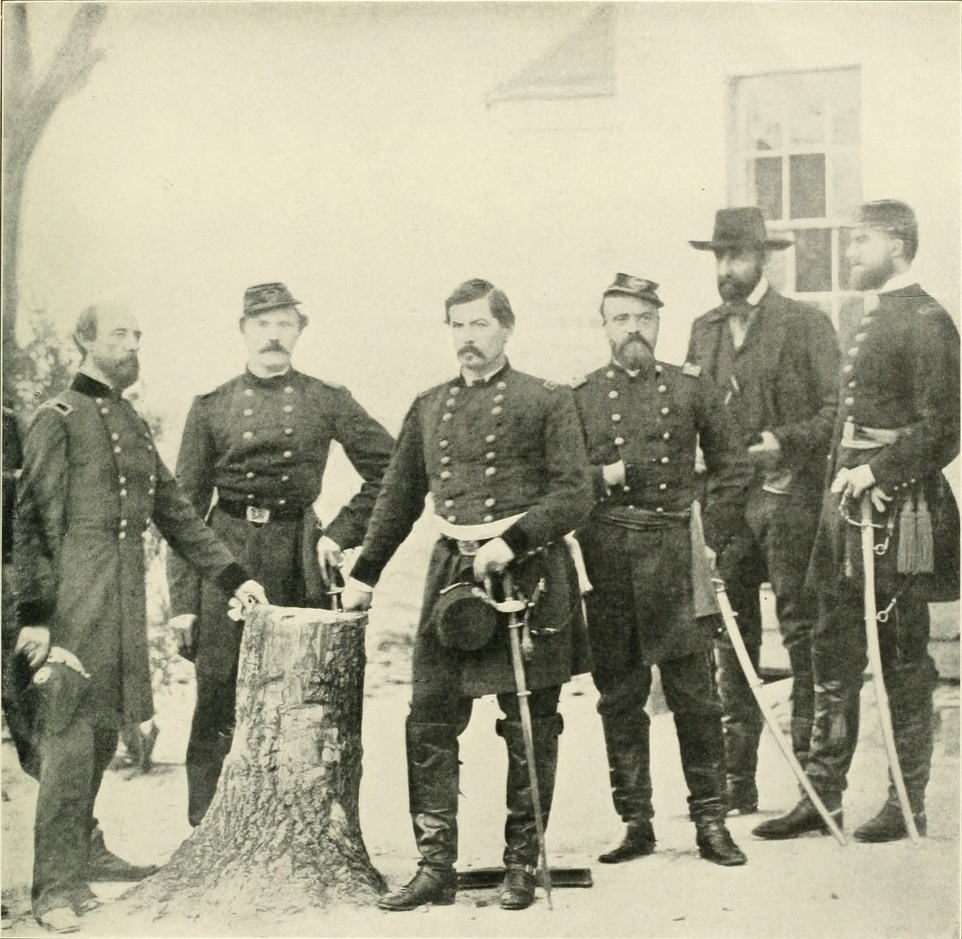
General George B. McClellan with staff & dignitaries (from left to right): Gen. George W. Morell, Lt. Col. A.V. Colburn, Gen. McClellan, Lt. Col. N.B. Sweitzer, Prince de Joinville (son of King Louis Phillippe of France), and on the very right—the prince's nephew, Count de Paris

During the summer and fall, McClellan brought a high degree of organization to his new army, and greatly improved its morale with frequent trips to review and encourage his units. It was a remarkable achievement, in which he came to personify the Army of the Potomac and reaped the adulation of his men. He created defenses for Washington that were almost impregnable, consisting of 48 forts and strong points, with 480 guns manned by 7,200 artillerists. The Army of the Potomac grew in number from 50,000 in July to 168,000 in November, becoming the largest military force the United States had raised until that time. But this was also a time of tension in the high command, as he continued to quarrel frequently with the government and the general-in-chief, Lt. Gen. Scott, on matters of strategy. McClellan rejected the tenets of Scott's Anaconda Plan, favoring instead an overwhelming grand battle, in the Napoleonic style. He proposed that his army should be expanded to 273,000 men and 600 guns and "crush the rebels in one campaign". He favored a war that would impose little impact on civilian populations and require no emancipation of slaves.

McClellan's antipathy to emancipation added to the pressure on him, as he received bitter criticism from Radical Republicans in the government. He viewed slavery as an institution recognized in the Constitution, and entitled to federal protection wherever it existed (Lincoln held the same public position until August 1862). McClellan's writings after the war were typical of many Northerners: "I confess to a prejudice in favor of my own race, & can't learn to like the odor of either Billy goats or niggers." But in November 1861, he wrote to his wife, "I will, if successful, throw my sword onto the scale to force an improvement in the condition of those poor blacks." He later wrote that had it been his place to arrange the terms of peace, he would have insisted on gradual emancipation, guarding the rights of both slaves and masters, as part of any settlement. But he made no secret of his opposition to the Radical Republicans. He told Ellen, "I will not fight for the abolitionists." This put him in opposition with officials of the administration who believed he was attempting to implement the policies of the opposition party.

The immediate problem with McClellan's war strategy was that he was convinced the Confederates were ready to attack him with overwhelming numbers. On August 8, believing that the Confederacy had over 100,000 troops facing him (in contrast to the 35,000 they had actually deployed at Bull Run a few weeks earlier), he declared a state of emergency in the capital. By August 19, he estimated 150,000 rebel soldiers on his front. In this, McClellan was perhaps influenced by his questioning of Confederate deserter Edward B. McMurdy, whose testimony was not accepted by Lincoln, Secretary of State Seward, or General-in-Chief Scott, but reaffirmed for McClellan the numbers he had convinced himself of. McClellan's feeling of facing overwhelming odds in subsequent campaigns throughout his tenure as General of the Army of the Potomac were strongly influenced by the overblown enemy strength estimates of his secret service chief, detective Allan Pinkerton, but in August 1861, these estimates were entirely McClellan's own. The result was a level of extreme caution that sapped the initiative of McClellan's army and dismayed the government. Historian and biographer Stephen W. Sears observed that McClellan's actions would have been "essentially sound" for a commander who was as outnumbered as McClellan thought he was, but McClellan in fact rarely had less than a two-to-one advantage over the armies that opposed him in 1861 and 1862. That fall, for example, Confederate forces ranged from 35,000 to 60,000, whereas the Army of the Potomac in September numbered 122,000 men; in early December 170,000; by year end, 192,000.

The dispute with Scott became increasingly personal. Scott (as well as many in the War Department) was outraged that McClellan refused to divulge any details about his strategic planning, or even such basic information as the strengths and dispositions of his units. McClellan claimed he could not trust anyone in the administration to keep his plans secret from the press, and thus the enemy. In the course of a disagreement about defensive forces on the Potomac River, McClellan wrote to his wife on August 10: "Genl Scott is the great obstacle—he will not comprehend the danger & is either a traitor, or an incompetent. I have to fight my way against him." Scott became so disillusioned with the young general that he offered his resignation to President Lincoln, who initially refused to accept it. Rumors traveled through the capital that McClellan might resign, or instigate a military coup, if Scott were not removed. Lincoln's Cabinet met on October 18 and agreed to accept Scott's resignation for "reasons of health".

However, the subsequently formed Army of the Potomac had high morale and was extremely proud of their general, some even referring to McClellan as the savior of Washington. He prevented the army's morale from collapsing at least twice, in the aftermath of the First and Second Battles of Bull Run. Many historians argue that he was talented in this aspect.

=== General-in-chief ===
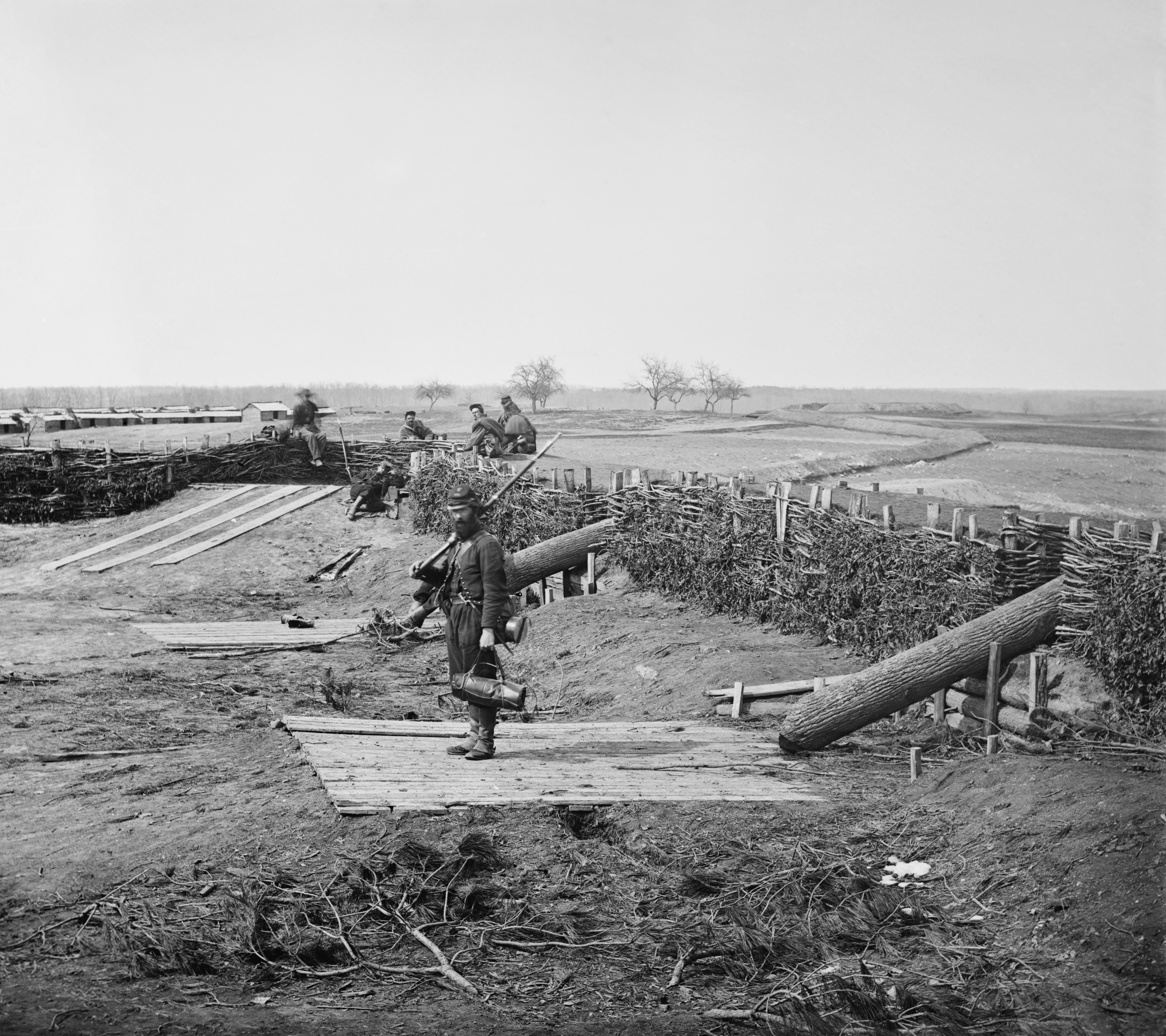
"Quaker guns" (logs used as ruses to imitate cannons) in former Confederate fortifications at Manassas Junction

On November 1, 1861, Winfield Scott retired and McClellan became general-in-chief of all the Union armies. The president expressed his concern about the "vast labor" involved in the dual role of army commander and general-in-chief, but McClellan responded, "I can do it all."

Lincoln, as well as many other leaders and citizens of the northern states, became increasingly impatient with McClellan's slowness to attack the Confederate forces still massed near Washington. The Union defeat at the minor Battle of Ball's Bluff near Leesburg in October added to the frustration and indirectly damaged McClellan. In December, the Congress formed a Joint Committee on the Conduct of the War, which became a thorn in the side of many generals throughout the war, accusing them of incompetence and, in some cases, treason. McClellan was called as the first witness on December 23, but he contracted typhoid fever and could not attend. Instead, his subordinate officers testified, and their candid admissions that they had no knowledge of specific strategies for advancing against the Confederates raised many calls for McClellan's dismissal.

McClellan further damaged his reputation by his insulting insubordination to his commander-in-chief. He privately referred to Lincoln, whom he had known before the war as a lawyer for the Illinois Central, as "nothing more than a well-meaning baboon", a "gorilla", and "ever unworthy of ... his high position". On November 13, he snubbed the president, who had come to visit McClellan's house, by making him wait for 30 minutes, only to be told that the general had gone to bed and could not receive him.

On January 10, 1862, Lincoln met with top generals (McClellan did not attend) and directed them to formulate a plan of attack, expressing his exasperation with General McClellan with the following remark: "If General McClellan does not want to use the army, I would like to borrow it for a time." On January 12, 1862, McClellan was summoned to the White House, where the Cabinet demanded to hear his war plans. For the first time, he revealed his intentions to transport the Army of the Potomac by ship to Urbanna, Virginia, on the Rappahannock River, outflanking the Confederate forces near Washington, and proceeding 50 miles (80 km) overland to capture Richmond. He refused to give any specific details of the proposed campaign, even to his friend, newly appointed War Secretary Edwin M. Stanton. On January 27, Lincoln issued an order that required all of his armies to begin offensive operations by February 22, Washington's birthday. On January 31, he issued a supplementary order for the Army of the Potomac to move overland to attack the Confederates at Manassas Junction and Centreville. McClellan immediately replied with a 22-page letter objecting in detail to the president's plan and advocating instead his Urbanna plan, which was the first written instance of the plan's details being presented to the president. Although Lincoln believed his plan was superior, he was relieved that McClellan finally agreed to begin moving, and reluctantly approved. On March 8, doubting McClellan's resolve, Lincoln again interfered with the army commander's prerogatives. He called a council of war at the White House in which McClellan's subordinates were asked about their confidence in the Urbanna plan. They expressed their confidence to varying degrees. After the meeting, Lincoln issued another order, naming specific officers as corps commanders to report to McClellan (who had been reluctant to do so prior to assessing his division commanders' effectiveness in combat, even though this would have meant his direct supervision of twelve divisions in the field).

Two more crises would confront McClellan before he could implement his plans. The Confederate forces under General Joseph E. Johnston withdrew from their positions before Washington, assuming new positions south of the Rappahannock, which completely nullified the Urbanna strategy. McClellan revised his plans to have his troops disembark at Fort Monroe, Virginia, and advance up the Virginia Peninsula to Richmond, an operation that would be known as the Peninsula Campaign. Then, however, McClellan came under extreme criticism in the press and Congress when it was learned that Johnston's forces had not only slipped away unnoticed, but had for months fooled the Union Army with logs painted black to appear as cannons, nicknamed Quaker Guns. Congress's joint committee visited the abandoned Confederate lines and radical Republicans introduced a resolution demanding the dismissal of McClellan, but it was narrowly defeated by a parliamentary maneuver. The second crisis was the emergence of the Confederate ironclad CSS Virginia, which threw Washington into a panic and made naval support operations on the James River seem problematic.

On March 11, 1862, Lincoln removed McClellan as general-in-chief, leaving him in command of only the Army of the Potomac, ostensibly so that McClellan would be free to devote all his attention to the move on Richmond. Lincoln's order was ambiguous as to whether McClellan might be restored following a successful campaign. In fact, the general-in-chief position was left unfilled. Lincoln, Stanton, and a group of officers who formed the "War Board" directed the strategic actions of the Union armies that spring. Although McClellan was assuaged by supportive comments Lincoln made to him, in time he saw the change of command very differently, describing it as a part of an intrigue "to secure the failure of the approaching campaign".

=== Peninsula campaign ===
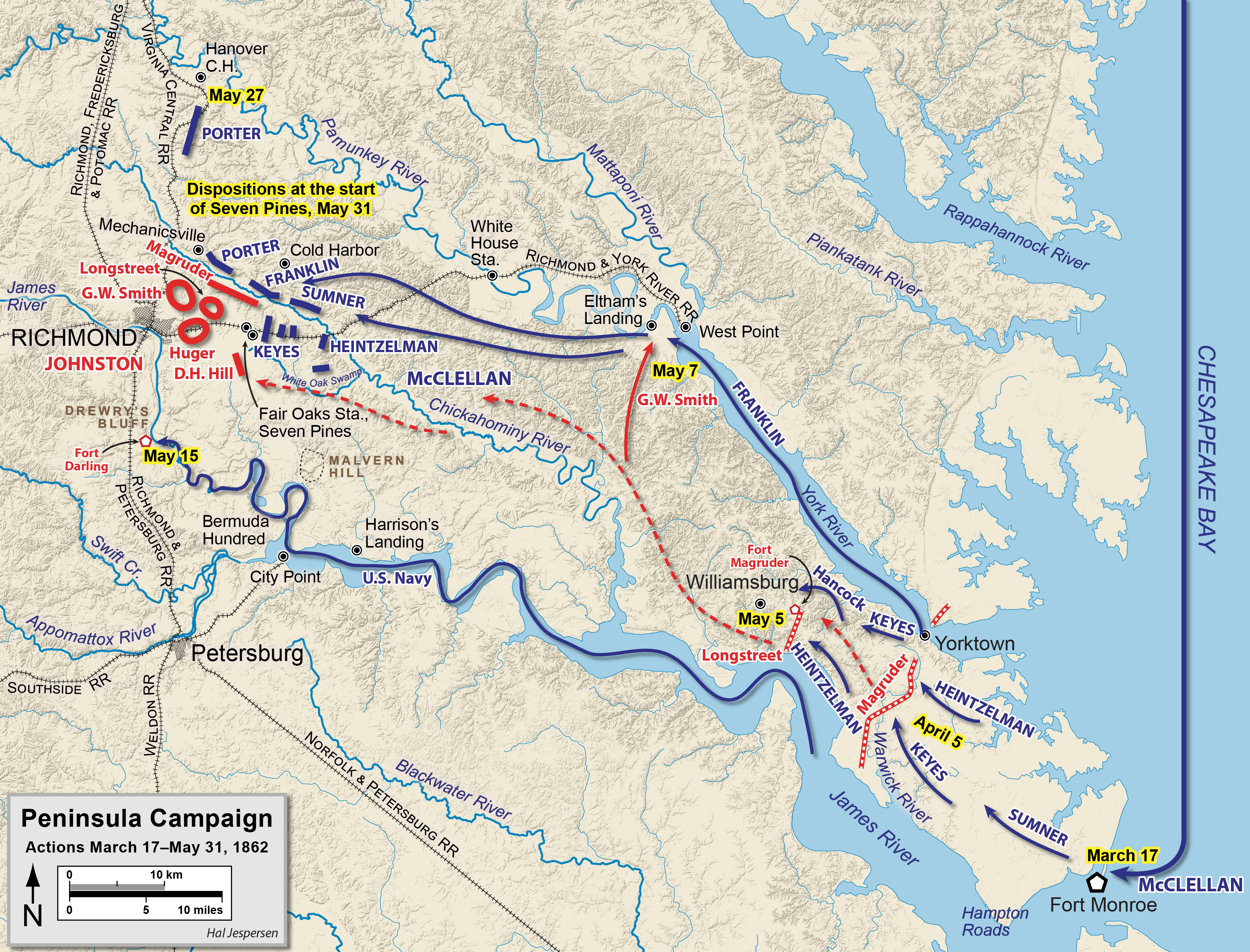
Peninsula Campaign, March–May 1862 Confederate Union

Seven Days Battles, June 25 – July 1, 1862

McClellan's army began to sail from Alexandria on March 17. It was an armada that dwarfed all previous American expeditions, transporting 121,500 men, 44 artillery batteries, 1,150 wagons, over 15,000 horses, and tons of equipment and supplies. An English observer remarked that it was the "stride of a giant". The army's advance from Fort Monroe up the Virginia Peninsula proved to be slow. McClellan's plan for a rapid seizure of Yorktown was foiled by the removal of 1st Corps from the Army of the Potomac for the defense of Washington. McClellan had hoped to use the 1st Corps to capture Glouchester Point and thus outflank the Confederate position. When he discovered that the Confederates had fortified a line across the Peninsula he hesitated to attack and instead "played it safe". As Swinton notes:

It is possible, however—and there is a considerable volume of evidence bearing upon this point—that General McClellan, during all the earlier portion of the month before Yorktown, had it in his mind, even without McDowell's corps, to undertake the decisive turning movement by the north side of the York. In this event, it would not only be in the direction of his plan to make no attack, but it would play into his hands that his opponent should accumulate his forces on the Peninsula. Yet this halting between two opinions had the result that, when he had abandoned the purpose of making the turning movement, it had become too late for him to make a direct attack.

McClellan asked for the opinion of his chief engineer John G. Barnard, who recommended against an assault. This caused him to decide on a siege of the city, which required considerable preparation.

McClellan continued to believe intelligence reports that credited the Confederates with two or three times the men they actually had. Early in the campaign, Confederate General John B. "Prince John" Magruder defended the Peninsula against McClellan's advance with a vastly smaller force. He created a false impression of many troops behind the lines and of even more troops arriving. He accomplished this by marching small groups of men repeatedly past places where they could be observed at a distance or were just out of sight, accompanied by great noise and fanfare. During this time, General Johnston was able to provide Magruder with reinforcements, but even then there were far fewer troops than McClellan believed were opposite him.

After a month of preparation, just before he was to assault the Confederate works at Yorktown, McClellan learned that Johnston had withdrawn up the Peninsula towards Williamsburg. McClellan was thus required to give chase without any benefit of the heavy artillery so carefully amassed in front of Yorktown. The Battle of Williamsburg on May 5 is considered a Union victory—McClellan's first—but the Confederate army was not destroyed and most of their troops were successfully moved past Williamsburg to Richmond's outer defenses while the battle was waged and for several days thereafter.

McClellan had also placed hopes on a simultaneous naval approach to Richmond via the James River. That approach failed following the Union Navy's defeat at the Battle of Drewry's Bluff, about 7 miles (11 km) downstream from the Confederate capital, on May 15. Basing artillery on a strategic bluff high above a bend in the river, and sinking boats to create an impassable series of obstacles in the river itself, the Confederates effectively blocked this potential approach to Richmond.

McClellan's army moved towards Richmond over the next three weeks, coming to within four miles (6.4 km) of it. He established a supply base on the Pamunkey River (a navigable tributary of the York River) at White House Landing where the Richmond and York River Railroad extending to Richmond crossed, and commandeered the railroad, transporting steam locomotives and rolling stock to the site by barge.

On May 31, as McClellan planned an assault, his army was surprised by a Confederate attack. Johnston saw that the Union army was split in half by the rain-swollen Chickahominy River and hoped to defeat it in detail at Seven Pines and Fair Oaks. McClellan was unable to command the army personally because of a recurrence of malarial fever, but his subordinates repelled the attacks. Nevertheless, McClellan received criticism from Washington for not counterattacking, which some believed could have opened the city of Richmond to capture. Johnston was wounded in the battle, and General Robert E. Lee assumed command of the Army of Northern Virginia. McClellan spent the next three weeks repositioning his troops and waiting for promised reinforcements. As Lee recounted, McClellan was attempting to make "this a battle of posts" which would lock the Confederate army in an attritional battle with superior Union firepower.

At the end of June, Lee began a series of attacks that became known as the Seven Days Battles. The first major battle, at Mechanicsville, was poorly coordinated by Lee and his subordinates and resulted in heavy casualties for little tactical gain. However, the battle had a significant impact on McClellan's nerve. The surprise appearance of Maj. Gen. Stonewall Jackson's troops in the battle (when they had last been reported to be many miles away in the Shenandoah Valley) convinced McClellan that he was even more outnumbered than he had thought. He reported to Washington that he faced 200,000 Confederates, perhaps due to a false report on the arrival of another Confederate army P.G.T. Beauregard. The number of men McClellan was actually faced varies, with Joseph Harsh in Confederate Tide Rising placing Lee's army at 112,220 men compared with the 105,857 under McClellan.

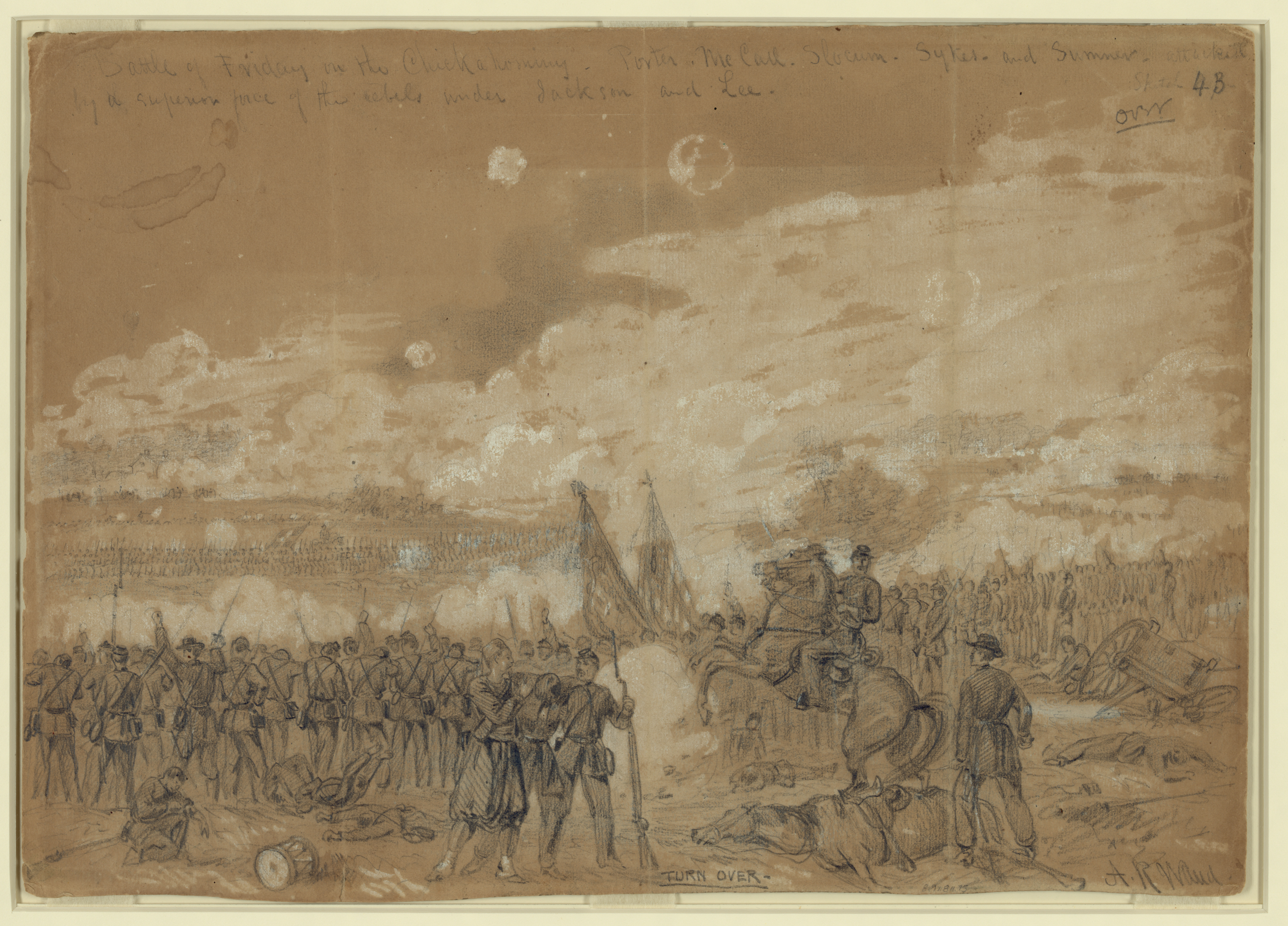
Federal troops under heavy attack at the Battle of Gaines' Mill, sketched by Alfred R. Waud and published in Harper's Weekly, July 26, 1862

Lee continued his offensive at Gaines' Mill to the east. That night, McClellan decided to withdraw his army to a safer base, well below Richmond, on a portion of the James River that was under control of the Union Navy. In doing so, Lee had assumed that the Union army would withdraw to the east toward its existing supply base and McClellan's move to the south delayed Lee's response for at least 24 hours. Ethan Rafuse notes "McClellan's change of base to the James, however, thwarted Lee's attempt to do this. Not only did McClellan's decision allow the Federals to gain control of the time and place for the battles that took place in late June and early July, it enabled them to fight in a way that inflicted terrible beating on the Confederate army....More importantly, by the end of the Seven Days Battles, McClellan had dramatically improved his operational situation."

But McClellan was also tacitly acknowledging that he would no longer be able to invest Richmond, the object of his campaign; the heavy siege artillery required would be almost impossible to transport without the railroad connections available from his original supply base on the York River. In a telegram to Secretary of War Edwin Stanton, reporting on these events, McClellan blamed the Lincoln administration for his reversals. "If I save this army now, I tell you plainly I owe no thanks to you or to any other persons in Washington. You have done your best to sacrifice this army." Fortunately for McClellan, Lincoln never saw that inflammatory statement (at least at that time) because it was censored by the War Department telegrapher.

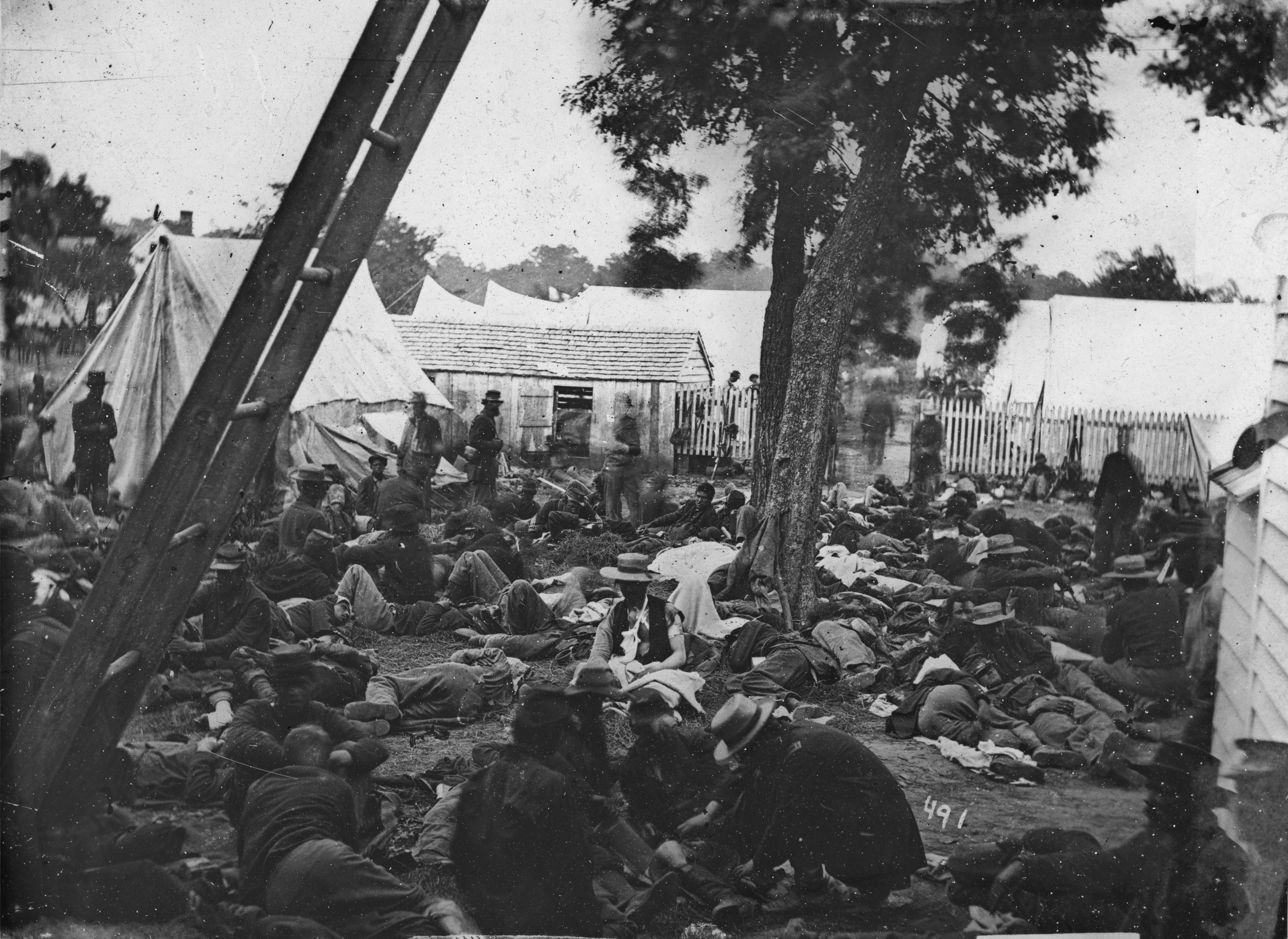
Wounded men after the Battle of Savage's Station, one of the Seven Days Battles

McClellan was also fortunate that the failure of the campaign left his army mostly intact, because he was generally absent from the fighting and neglected to name any second-in-command who might direct his retreat. Military historian Stephen W. Sears wrote, "When he deserted his army on the Glendale and Malvern Hill battlefields during the Seven Days, he was guilty of dereliction of duty. Had the Army of the Potomac been wrecked on either of these fields (at Glendale the possibility had been real), that charge under the Articles of War would likely have been brought against him." In the battle of Glendale, McClellan was five miles (8.0 km) away behind Malvern Hill, without telegraph communications and too distant to command his army. In the battle of Malvern Hill, he was on a gunboat, the USS Galena, which at one point was ten miles (16 km) away, down the James River. In both battles, effective command of the army fell to his friend and V Corps commander Brigadier General Fitz John Porter. When the public heard about the Galena, it was yet another great embarrassment, comparable to the Quaker Guns at Manassas. Editorial cartoons published in the course of the 1864 presidential campaign lampooned McClellan for having preferred the safety of a ship while a battle was fought in the distance.

McClellan was reunited with his army at Harrison's Landing on the James. Debates were held as to whether the army should be evacuated or attempt to resume an offensive toward Richmond. McClellan maintained his estrangement from Abraham Lincoln with his repeated call for reinforcements and by writing a lengthy letter in which he proposed strategic and political guidance for the war, continuing his opposition to abolition or seizure of slaves as a tactic. He concluded by implying he should be restored as general-in-chief, but Lincoln responded by naming Maj. Gen. Henry W. Halleck to the post without consulting, or even informing, McClellan. Lincoln and Stanton also offered command of the Army of the Potomac to Maj. Gen. Ambrose Burnside, who refused the appointment.

Back in Washington, a reorganization of units created the Army of Virginia under Maj. Gen. John Pope, who was directed to advance toward Richmond from the northeast. McClellan, not wishing to abandon his campaign, delayed the return of the Army of the Potomac from the Peninsula enough so that the reinforcements arrived while the northern Virginia campaign was already underway. The Fifth Corps under Porter from the Army of the Potomac would serve with Pope during the campaign. A frustrated McClellan wrote to his wife before the battle, "Pope will be thrashed ... & be disposed of [by Lee]. ... Such a villain as he is ought to bring defeat upon any cause that employs him." Lee had gambled on removing significant units from the Peninsula to attack Pope, who was beaten decisively at Second Bull Run in August.

=== Maryland campaign ===
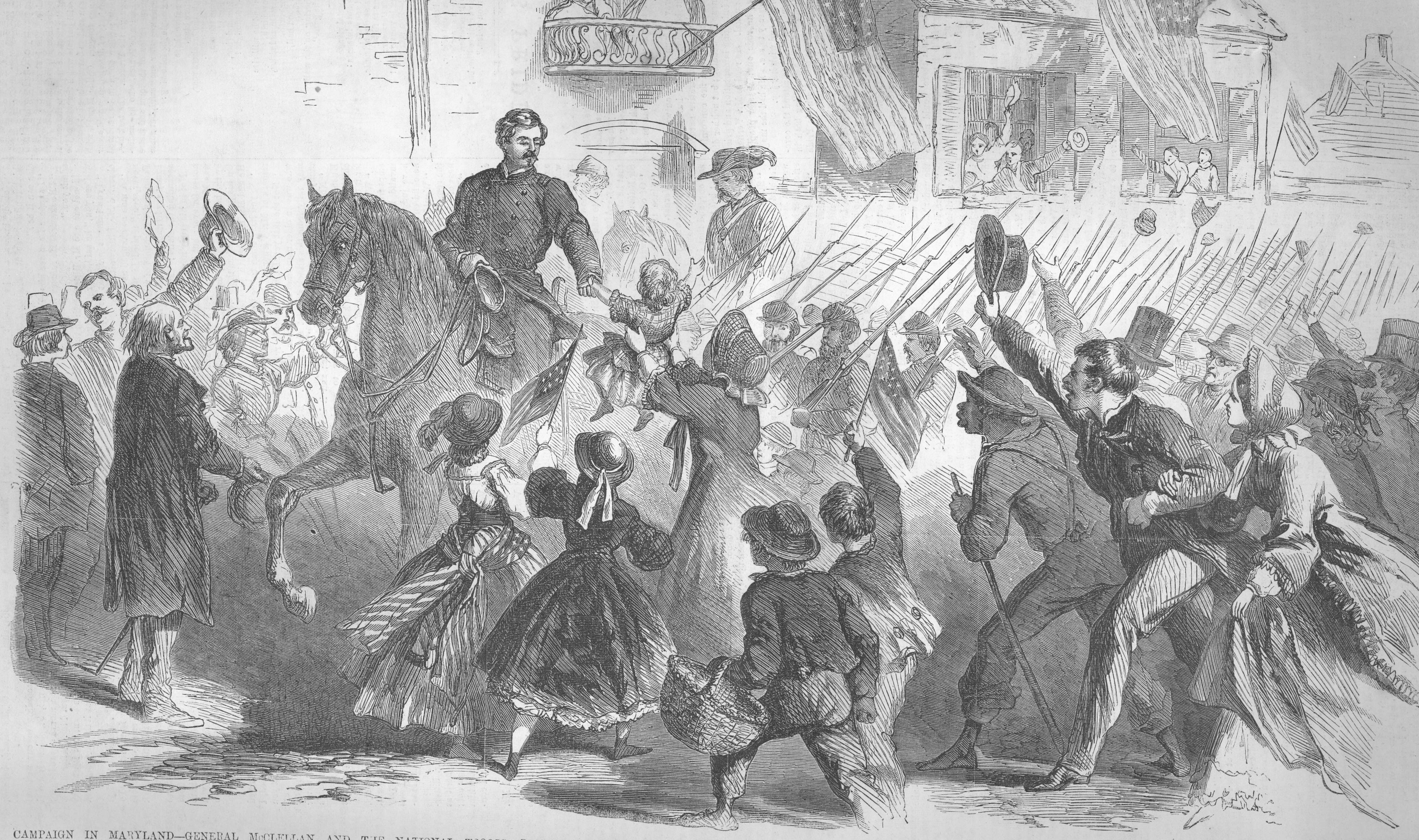
An illustration of McClellan riding through Frederick, Maryland, September 12, 1862, from Frank Leslie's Illustrated Newspaper

Maryland campaign, actions September 3–15, 1862

After the defeat of Pope at Second Bull Run, President Lincoln reluctantly returned to McClellan. On September 2, 1862, Lincoln named McClellan to command "the fortifications of Washington, and all the troops for the defense of the capital". The appointment was controversial in the Cabinet, a majority of whom signed a petition declaring to the president "our deliberate opinion that, at this time, it is not safe to entrust to Major General McClellan the command of any Army of the United States". The president admitted that it was like "curing the bite with the hair of the dog". But Lincoln told his secretary, John Hay, "We must use what tools we have. There is no man in the Army who can man these fortifications and lick these troops of ours into shape half as well as he. If he can't fight himself, he excels in making others ready to fight."

Northern fears of a continued offensive by Robert E. Lee were realized when he launched his Maryland campaign on September 4, hoping to arouse pro-Southern sympathy in the slave state of Maryland. McClellan's pursuit began on September 5. He marched toward Maryland with six of his reorganized corps. Numbers vary as to the size of McClellan's force with its paper strength at 87,164. Steven R. Stotelmyer in Too Useful to Sacrifice places it at about 60,000 men, noting that the 87,000 number includes non-combat soldiers and units not immediately available. McClellan left two corps behind to defend Washington. McClellan's reception in Frederick, Maryland, as he marched towards Lee's army, was described by the correspondent for Harper's Magazine:

The General rode through the town on a trot, and the street was filled six or eight deep with his staff and guard riding on behind him. The General had his head uncovered, and received gracefully the salutations of the people. Old ladies and men wept for joy, and scores of beautiful ladies waved flags from the balconies of houses upon the street, and their joyousness seemed to overcome every other emotion. When the General came to the corner of the principal street the ladies thronged around him. Bouquets, beautiful and fragrant, in great numbers were thrown at him, and the ladies crowded around him with the warmest good wishes, and many of them were entirely overcome with emotion. I have never witnessed such a scene. The General took the gentle hands which were offered to him with many a kind and pleasing remark, and heard and answered the many remarks and compliments with which the people accosted him. It was a scene which no one could forget—an event of a lifetime.

Lee divided his forces into multiple columns, spread apart widely as he moved into Maryland and also maneuvered to capture the federal arsenal at Harpers Ferry. This was a risky move for a smaller army, but Lee was counting on his knowledge of McClellan's temperament. He told one of his generals, "He is an able general but a very cautious one. His army is in a very demoralized and chaotic condition, and will not be prepared for offensive operations—or he will not think it so—for three or four weeks. Before that time I hope to be on the Susquehanna." Lee's assessment proved to be inaccurate as McClellan reacted quickly, with the Confederate leader remarking that McClellan was "advancing more rapidly than was convenient." Many classic histories have portrayed McClellan's army as moving lethargically, averaging only 6 miles (9.7 km) a day.

Meanwhile, Union soldiers accidentally found a copy of Lee's orders dividing his army, wrapped around a package of cigars in an abandoned camp. Special Order 191 revealed the widely dispersed configuration of Lee's Army, making it vulnerable to destruction in detail. The document was verified at McClellan's headquarters in Frederick on September 13. Upon realizing the intelligence value of this discovery, McClellan threw up his arms and exclaimed, "Now I know what to do!" He waved the order at his old Army friend, Brig. Gen. John Gibbon, and said, "Here is a paper with which if I cannot whip Bobbie Lee, I will be willing to go home." He telegraphed President Lincoln: "I have the whole rebel force in front of me, but I am confident, and no time shall be lost. I think Lee has made a gross mistake, and that he will be severely punished for it. I have all the plans of the rebels, and will catch them in their own trap if my men are equal to the emergency. ... Will send you trophies."

==== Battle of South Mountain ====
At the discovery of the Lost Order, McClellan's Assistant Adjutant General verified the signature and handwriting of the officer who wrote out the order, as he knew him well, so there was no doubt as to its authenticity. Within hours of receiving the order, McClellan dispatched some of his cavalry to assess whether the Confederates had moved in accordance with the order.

Still, historians—including James M. McPherson in Crossroads of Freedom: Antietam and The Battle Cry of Freedom, Stephen Sears in Landscape Turned Red, John Keegan in The American Civil War, and James V. Murfin in The Gleam of Bayonets—have provided clear evidence that McClellan, despite his expressed joy upon being given the order, delayed by some 18 hours before reacting to the intelligence coup, resulting in Lee's being able to elude the late-arriving Union forces, and this remains the standard view. However, Gene Thorp in a 2012 article in The Washington Post cited evidence that the vanguard of Army of the Potomac was in motion all day on the 13th due to orders McClellan had issued the previous day. After the war, McClellan held to the claim that he acted immediately to put his armies on the move.

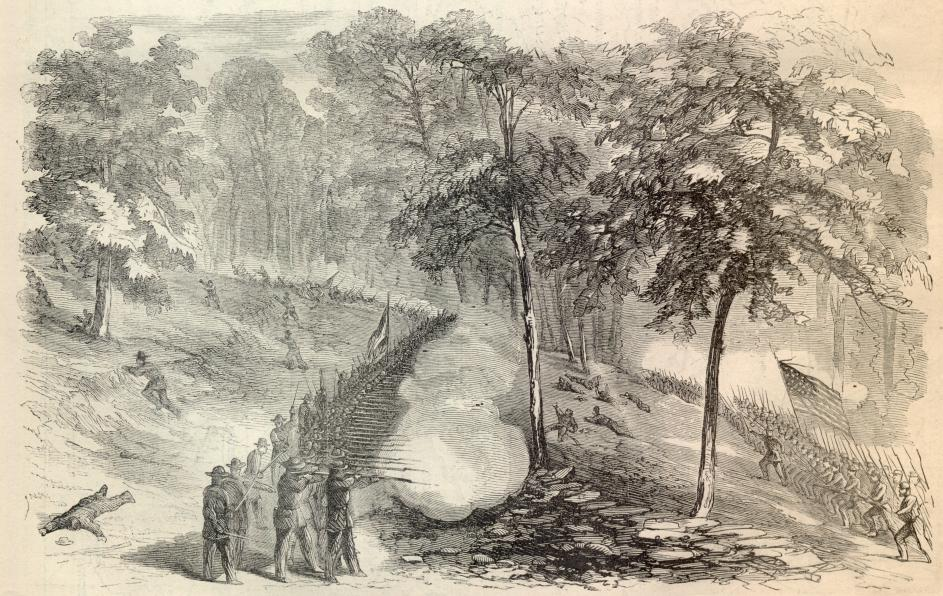
Battle of South Mountain by William Waud

McClellan ordered his units to set out for the South Mountain passes and was able to punch through the defended passes that separated them from Lee. The stubborn Confederate defenses gave Lee enough time to concentrate many of his men at Sharpsburg, Maryland. As noted by historians such as Stotelmyer, the significance of the Union victory at South Mountain should not be underestimated. It ruined Lee's plans to invade Pennsylvania and took the initiative away from the Confederate commander. The Battle of South Mountain also presented McClellan with an opportunity for one of the great theatrical moments of his career, as historian Sears describes:

The mountain ahead was wreathed in smoke eddies of battle smoke in which the gun flashes shone like brief hot sparks. The opposing battle lines on the heights were marked by heavier layers of smoke, and columns of Federal troops were visible winding their way up the mountainside, each column ... looking like a 'monstrous, crawling, blue-black snake' ... McClellan posed against this spectacular backdrop, sitting motionless astride his warhorse Dan Webster with his arm extended, pointing Hooker's passing troops toward the battle. The men cheered him until they were hoarse ... and some broke ranks to swarm around the martial figure and indulge in the 'most extravagant demonstrations'.

The Union army reached Antietam Creek, to the east of Sharpsburg, on the evening of September 15. A planned attack on September 16 was put off because of early morning fog, allowing Lee to prepare his defenses with an army less than half the size of McClellan's.

==== Battle of Antietam ====
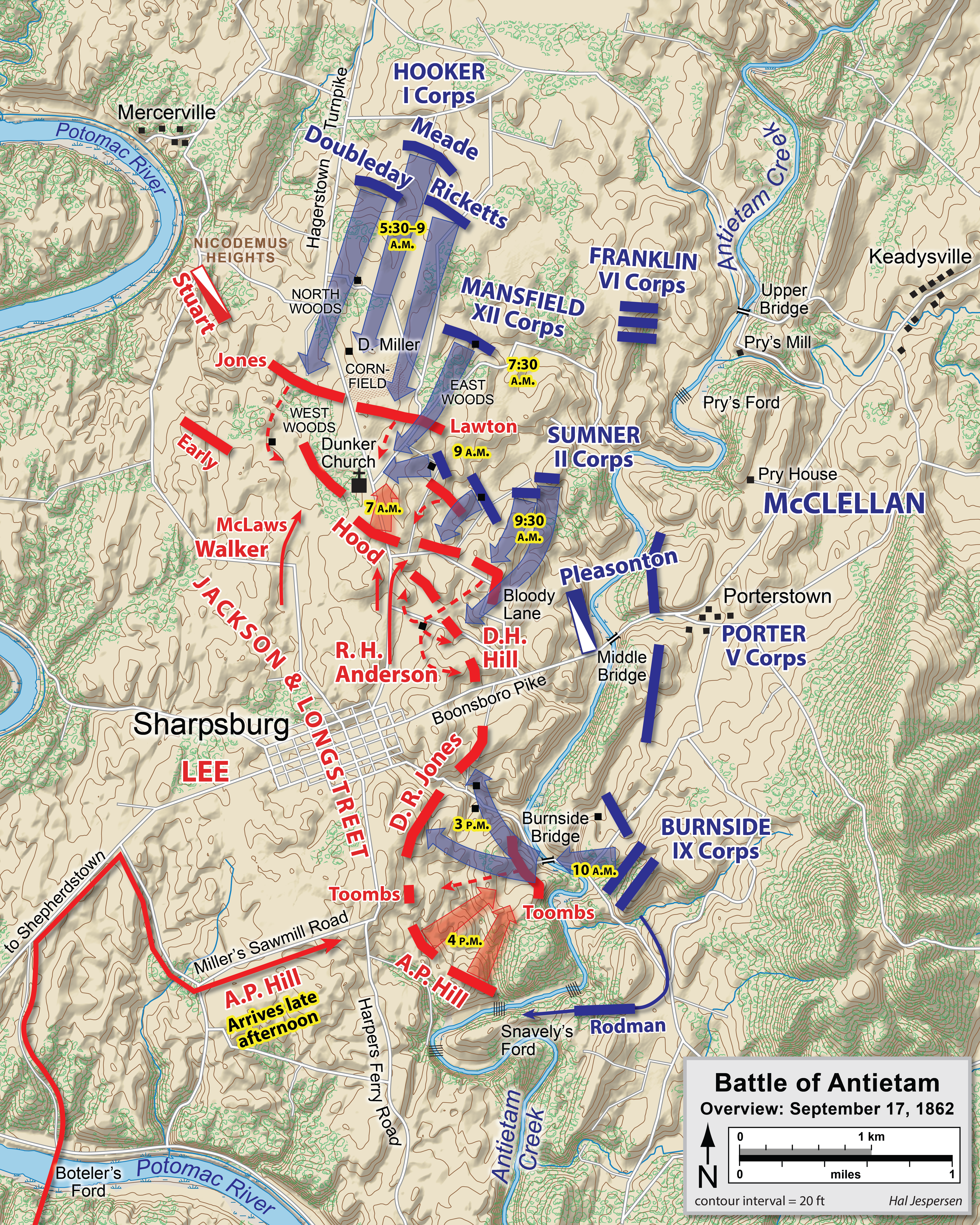
Overview of the Battle of Antietam

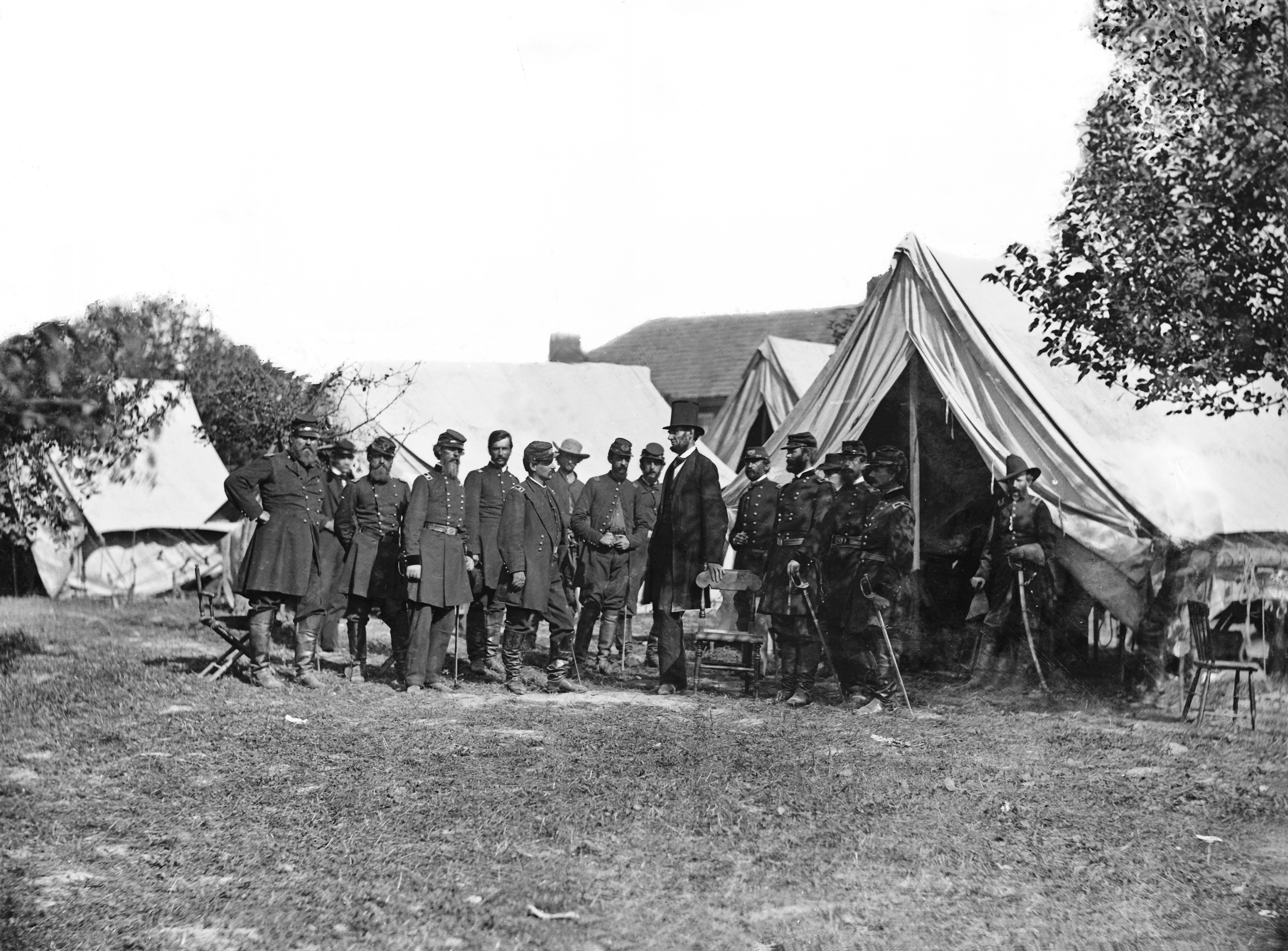
Lincoln with McClellan and staff after the Battle of Antietam. Notable figures (from left) are 5. Alexander S. Webb, Chief of Staff, V Corps; 6. McClellan;. 8. Jonathan Letterman; 10. Lincoln; 11. Henry J. Hunt; 12. Fitz John Porter; 15. Andrew A. Humphreys; 16. Capt. George Armstrong Custer

The Battle of Antietam on September 17, 1862, was the single bloodiest day in American military history. The outnumbered Confederate forces fought desperately and well. Despite significant advantages in manpower, McClellan was unable to concentrate his forces effectively, which meant that Lee was able to shift his defenders to parry each of three Union thrusts, launched separately and sequentially against the Confederate left, center, and finally the right. McClellan was also unwilling to employ his ample reserve forces to capitalize on localized successes. Historian James M. McPherson has pointed out that the two corps McClellan kept in reserve were in fact larger than Lee's entire force. The reason for McClellan's reluctance was that, as in previous battles, he was convinced he was outnumbered.

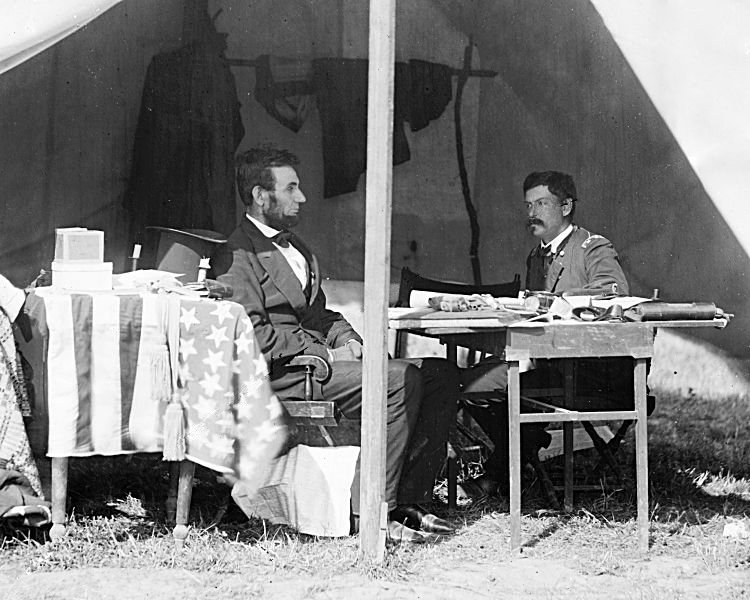
Lincoln in McClellan's tent after the Battle of Antietam

The battle was tactically inconclusive, with the Union suffering a higher overall number of casualties, although Lee technically was defeated because he withdrew first from the battlefield and retreated back to Virginia, and lost a larger percentage of his army than McClellan did. McClellan wired to Washington, "Our victory was complete. The enemy is driven back into Virginia." Yet there was obvious disappointment that McClellan had not crushed Lee, who was fighting with a smaller army with its back to the Potomac River. Although McClellan's subordinates can claim their share of responsibility for delays (such as Ambrose Burnside's misadventures at Burnside Bridge) and blunders (Edwin V. Sumner's attack without reconnaissance), these were localized problems from which the full army could have recovered. As with the decisive battles in the Seven Days, McClellan's headquarters were too far to the rear to allow his personal control over the battle. He made no use of his cavalry forces for reconnaissance. He did not share his overall battle plans with his corps commanders, which prevented them from using initiative outside of their sectors. And he was far too willing to accept cautious advice about saving his reserves, such as when a significant breakthrough in the center of the Confederate line could have been exploited, but Fitz John Porter is said to have told McClellan, "Remember, General, I command the last reserve of the last Army of the Republic."

Despite being a tactical draw, Antietam is considered a turning point of the war and a victory for the Union because it ended Lee's strategic campaign (his first invasion of the North), and it gave President Lincoln the victory he thought he needed to issue the Preliminary Emancipation Proclamation on September 22, 1862. Although Lincoln had considered issuing the Preliminary Emancipation Proclamation earlier, Secretary of State William H. Seward persuaded him to wait until a Union victory to avoid the perception that it was issued out of desperation. The Union victory and Lincoln's proclamation played a considerable role in dissuading the governments of France and Britain from recognizing the Confederacy; some suspected they were planning to do so in the aftermath of another Union defeat.

Because McClellan failed to pursue Lee aggressively after Antietam, on November 5, 1862, Lincoln ordered his removal from command. Maj. Gen. Ambrose Burnside assumed command of the Army of the Potomac on November 9, 1862. McClellan wrote to his wife:

Those in whose judgment I rely tell me that I fought the battle splendidly and that it was a masterpiece of art.... I feel I have done all that can be asked in twice saving the country.... I feel some little pride in having, with a beaten & demoralized army, defeated Lee so utterly.... Well, one of these days history will I trust do me justice.

== 1864 presidential election ==
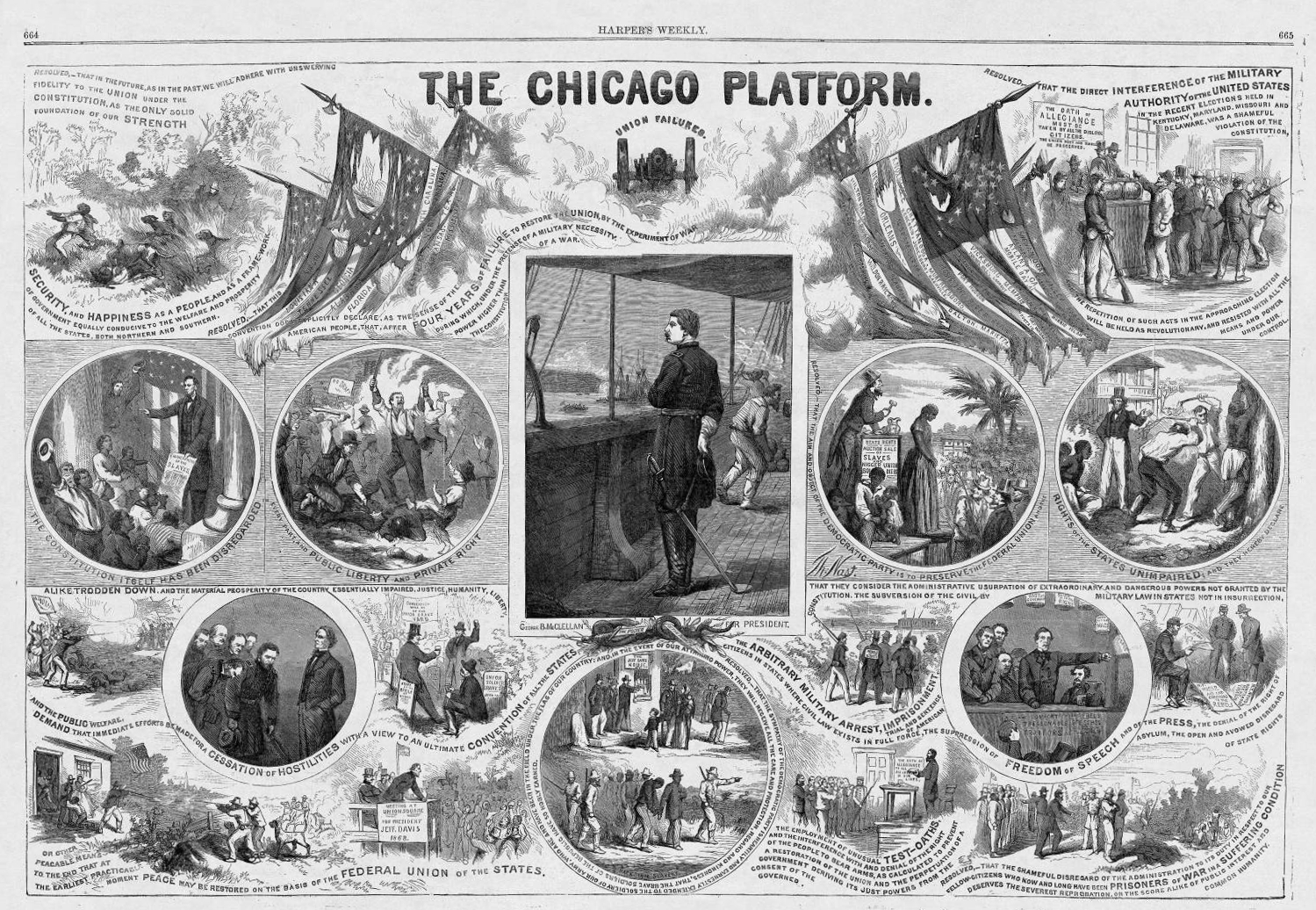
An anti-McClellan poster from Harper's Weekly, drawn by Thomas Nast, showing rioters assaulting children, slave-catchers chasing runaway slaves, and a woman being sold at a slave auction

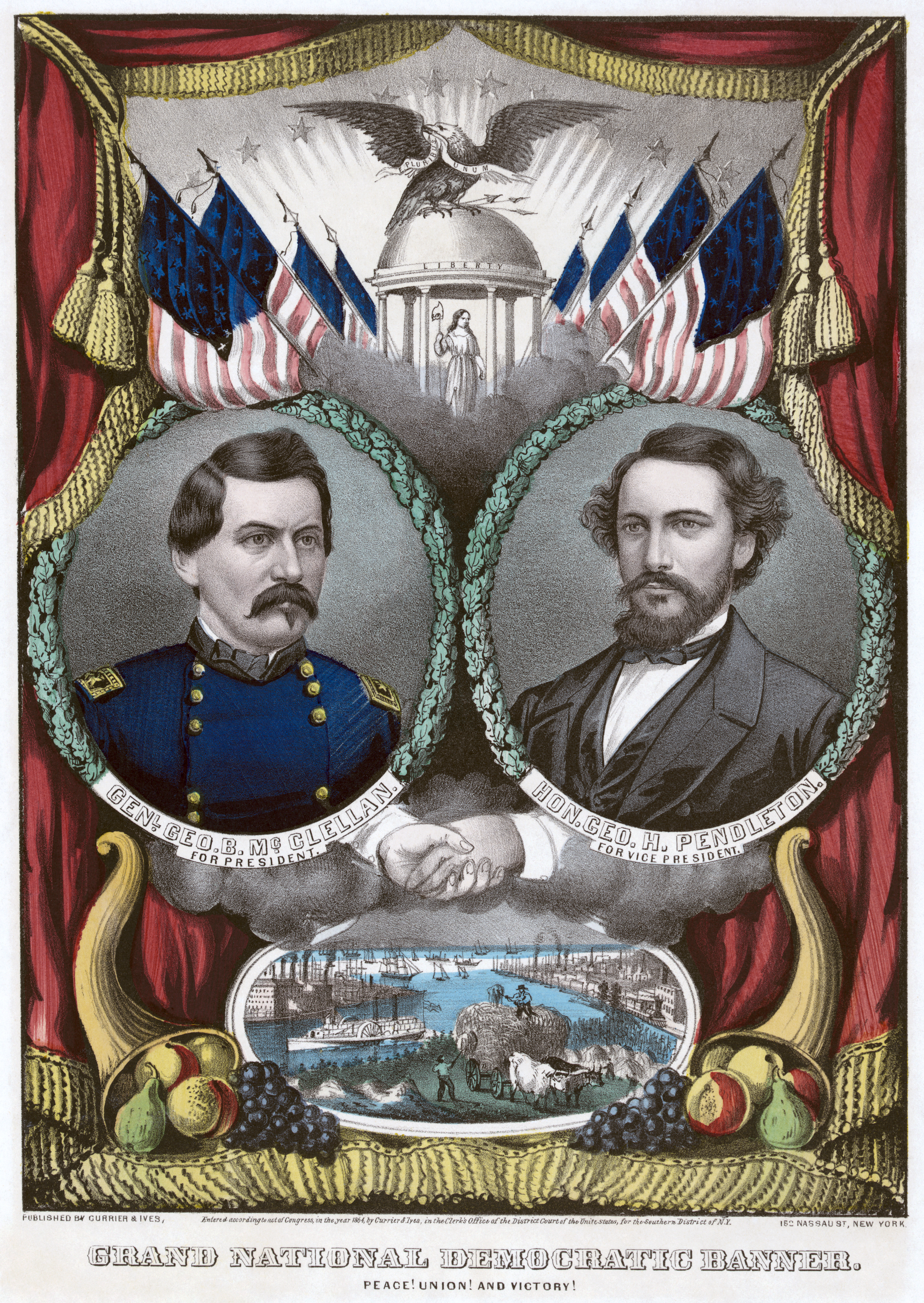
Currier and Ives print of the McClellan–Pendleton Democratic presidential party ticket, 1864. Lithograph with watercolor.

Secretary Stanton ordered McClellan to report to Trenton, New Jersey, for further orders, although none were issued. As the war progressed, there were various calls to return McClellan to an important command, following the Union defeats at Fredericksburg and Chancellorsville, as Robert E. Lee moved north at the start of the Gettysburg campaign, and as Jubal Early threatened Washington in 1864. When Ulysses S. Grant became general-in-chief, he discussed returning McClellan to an unspecified position. But all of these opportunities were impossible, given the opposition within the administration and the knowledge that McClellan posed a potential political threat. McClellan worked for months on a lengthy report describing his two major campaigns and his successes in organizing the Army, replying to his critics and justifying his actions by accusing the administration of undercutting him and denying him necessary reinforcements. The War Department was reluctant to publish his report because, just after completing it in October 1863, McClellan openly declared his entrance to the political stage as a Democrat.

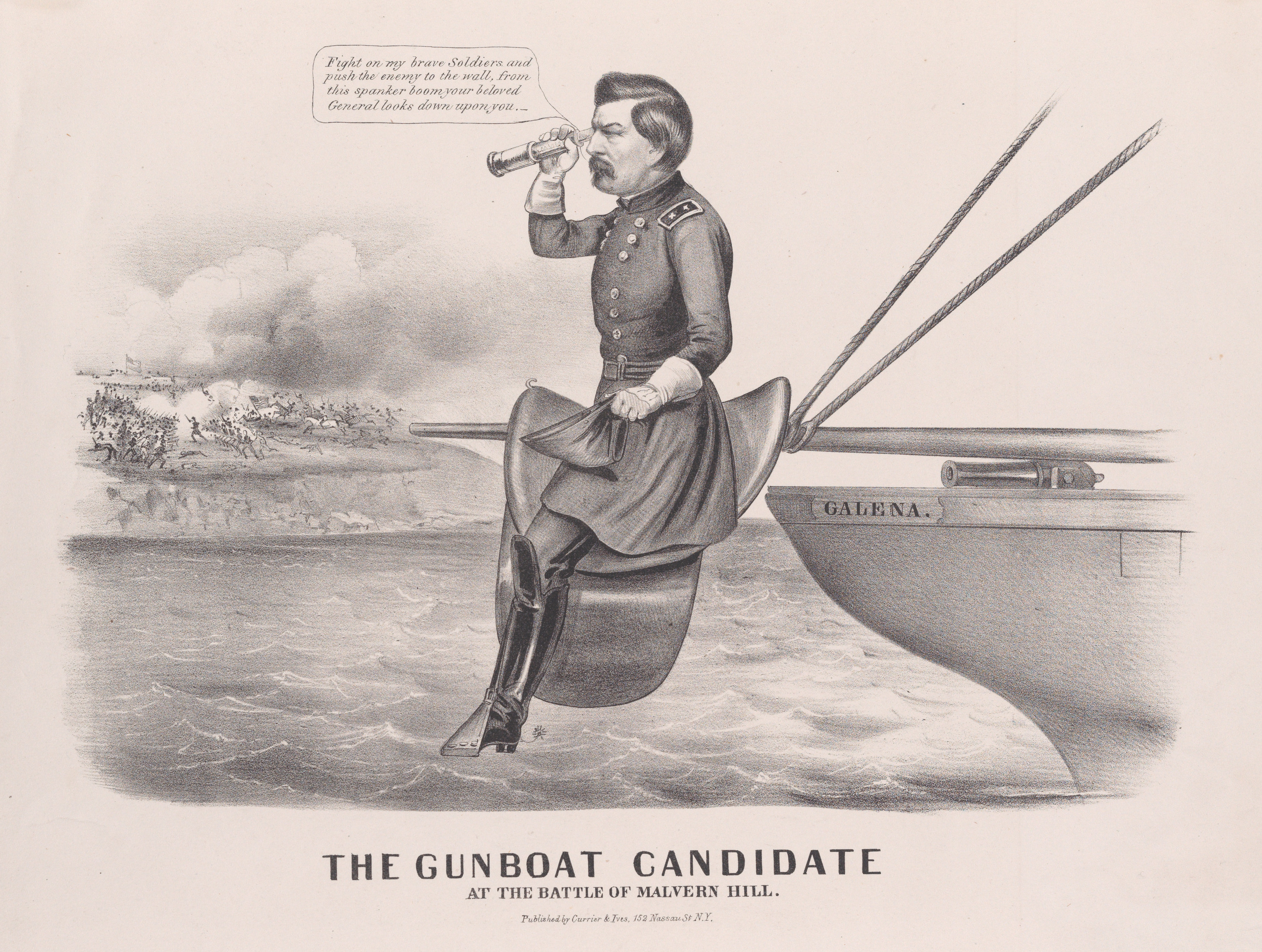
Cartoon of McClellan used by his political opponents in 1864 presidential campaign

McClellan was nominated at the 1864 Democratic National Convention to run against Abraham Lincoln in the 1864 United States presidential election. Following the example of Winfield Scott, he ran as a U.S. Army general still on active duty; he did not resign his commission until election day, November 8, 1864. McClellan supported continuation of the war and restoration of the Union, but not the abolition of slavery, although the party platform, written by Copperhead leader Clement Vallandigham of Ohio, was opposed to that position. The platform called for an immediate cessation of hostilities and a negotiated settlement with the Confederacy. McClellan was forced to repudiate the platform, which made his campaign inconsistent and difficult. He also was not helped by the party's choice for vice president, George H. Pendleton, a peace candidate from Ohio known for the Pendleton Act civil service reforms.

The deep division in the party, the unity of the Republicans (running under the label "National Union Party"), the absence of a large portion of the Democrats' base (the South) from the voter pool, and the military successes by Union forces in the fall of 1864, doomed McClellan's candidacy. Lincoln won the election handily, with 212 Electoral College votes to 21, and a popular vote of 2,218,388 to 1,812,807 or 55% to 45%. For all his popularity with the troops, McClellan failed to secure their support and the military vote went to Lincoln nearly 3–1. Lincoln's share of the vote in the Army of the Potomac was 70%.

== Postwar years ==
At the conclusion of the war (1865) McClellan and his family went to Europe, not returning until 1868; in this period he did not participate in politics. Prior to his return in September 1868, the Democratic Party had expressed some interest in nominating him for president again, but Ulysses S. Grant became the Republican candidate in May 1868, and this interest died. McClellan worked on engineering projects in New York City and was offered the position of president of the newly formed University of California, which he declined.

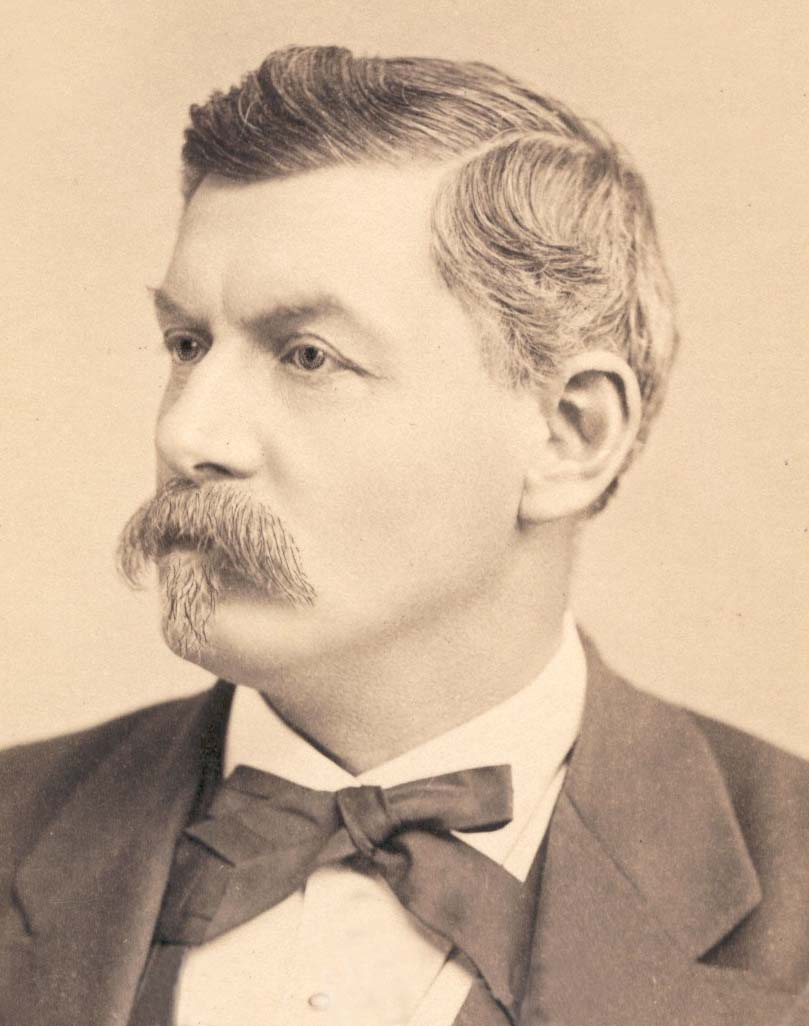
McClellan photographed by William S. Warren, circa 1880

McClellan was appointed chief engineer of the New York City Department of Docks in 1870. Beginning in 1872, he also served as the president of the Atlantic and Great Western Railroad. He and his family then embarked on another three-year stay in Europe (1873–75).

In March 1877, the Governor of New York, Lucius Robinson, nominated McClellan to serve as the first state Superintendent of Public Works, but the New York State Senate rejected him as "incompetent to fill the position for which he was named".

== Governor of New Jersey (1878–1881) ==
=== Election ===
McClellan was a resident of West Orange, New Jersey in 1877 when the New Jersey Democratic Party nominated him for governor, an action that took him by surprise because he had not expressed an interest in the position. His nomination was largely an effort by key party members to prevent the leading candidate, Leon Abbett, from gaining the nomination. After his name was unexpectedly placed into nomination at the state convention, there was a stampede and he was nominated by acclamation.

In the general election, he faced William A. Newell, a Republican former governor who accused McClellan of living in New York, which he easily refuted. McClellan won the election as Democrats gained a majority in both houses of the New Jersey legislature for the first time since 1870.

=== Tenure ===
Most likely due to his personal popularity and celebrity, McClellan's inauguration was held outdoors to accommodate the large crowd. In his inaugural address, he said the most urgent matter before the state was relief from the Panic of 1873. To that end, he advocated for cautious spending to allow for a state tax cut of fifty percent; by the end of McClellan's term, the state tax on residents was abolished entirely.

Soon after taking office, McClellan fell out of favor with the State Senate over appointments and patronage. The legislature also enacted several highly partisan measures designed to ensure Democratic control, including an aggressive gerrymander of the New Jersey Assembly districts and another disenfranchising college students (who tended to vote Republican). Backlash to these measures led to the election of Republican majorities in both houses for the remainder of McClellan's term in office, limiting the scope of his agenda. McClellan's administration was marked by caution and conservatism. Few concrete measures passed and those that did, such as the abolition of the state tax and improvements to the National Guard, were widely popular.

In addition to tax reduction, McClellan's economic agenda included the institution of a Bureau of Statistics of Labor and Industries and the creation of an agricultural experiment station to modernize growing and farming practices. Both passed the legislature in 1878 and 1880, respectively. His administration stressed the necessity of education in the conversion of unskilled labor to skilled labor and in industrial development generally by expanding the state library and calling for trades training for young men in public schools, as suited for the local economy.

McClellan also applied his military experience to improve the discipline, organization, and armament of the New Jersey National Guard. During his administration, two companies were equipped with Gatling guns, a new battalion was organized, regular rifle practice was instituted, and provisions were made to supply new uniforms.

== Retirement and death ==
The concluding chapter of his political career was his strong support in 1884 for Grover Cleveland. He was interested in the position of Secretary of War in Cleveland's cabinet, but Senator John R. McPherson, who had opposed McClellan for governor in 1877, succeeded in blocking his nomination.

McClellan devoted his final years to traveling and writing; he produced his memoirs, McClellan's Own Story (published posthumously in 1887), in which he stridently defended his conduct during the war. He died unexpectedly of a heart attack at age 58 at Orange, New Jersey, after suffering from chest pains for a few weeks. His final words, at 3 a.m., October 29, 1885, were, "I feel easy now. Thank you." He was buried at Riverview Cemetery in Trenton.

== Family ==
McClellan's son, George B. McClellan Jr. (1865–1940), was born in Dresden in the Kingdom of Saxony during the family's first trip to Europe. Known within the family as Max, he too became a politician, serving as a United States representative (1893–1903) and as mayor of New York City from 1904 to 1909. McClellan's daughter, Mary ("May") (1861–1945), married a French diplomat and spent much of her life abroad. Both remained childless.

McClellan's wife, Ellen, died in Nice, France, in 1915 while visiting Mary at her home "Villa Antietam".

== Legacy ==
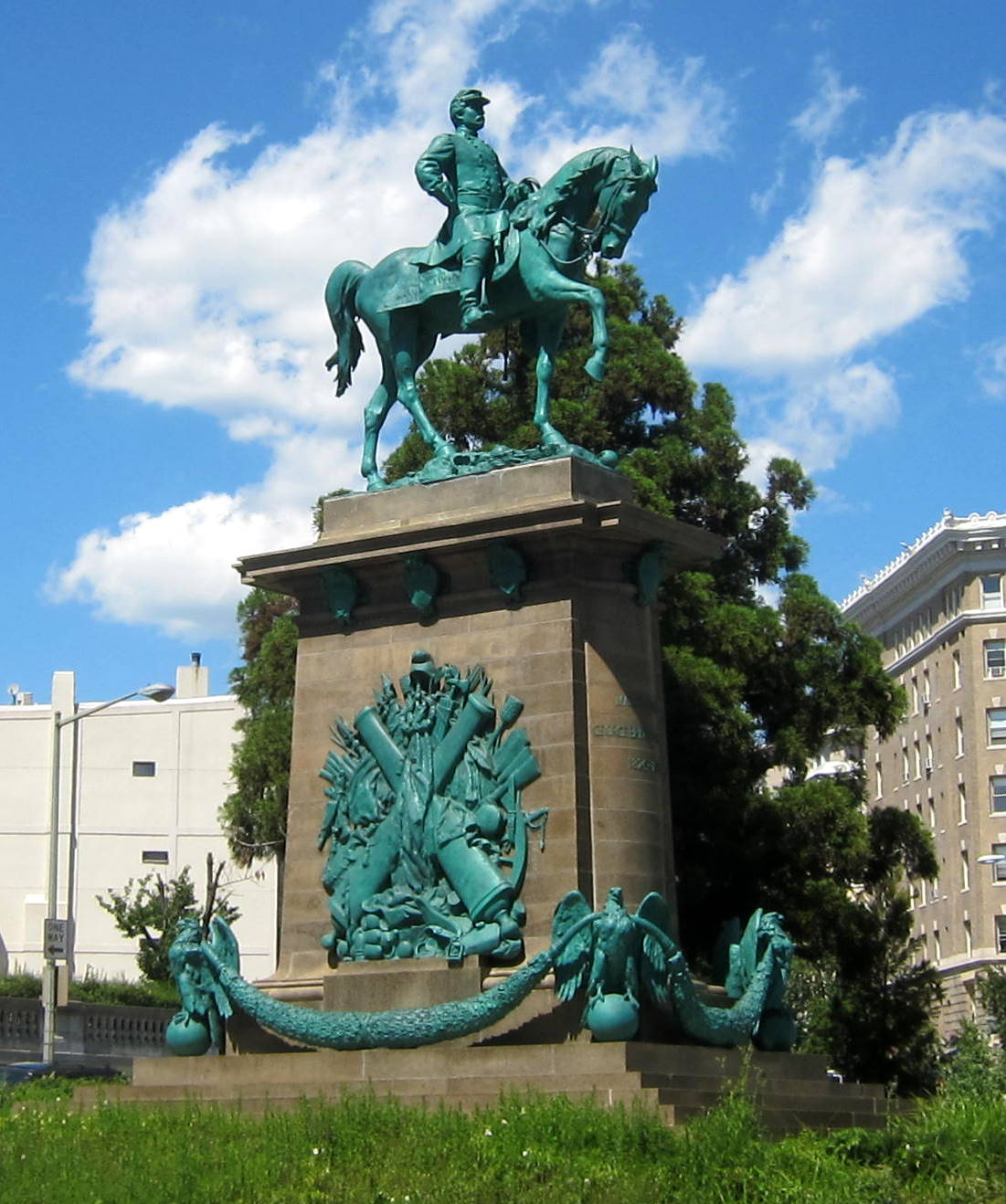
Major General George B. McClellan on Connecticut Avenue in Washington, D.C.

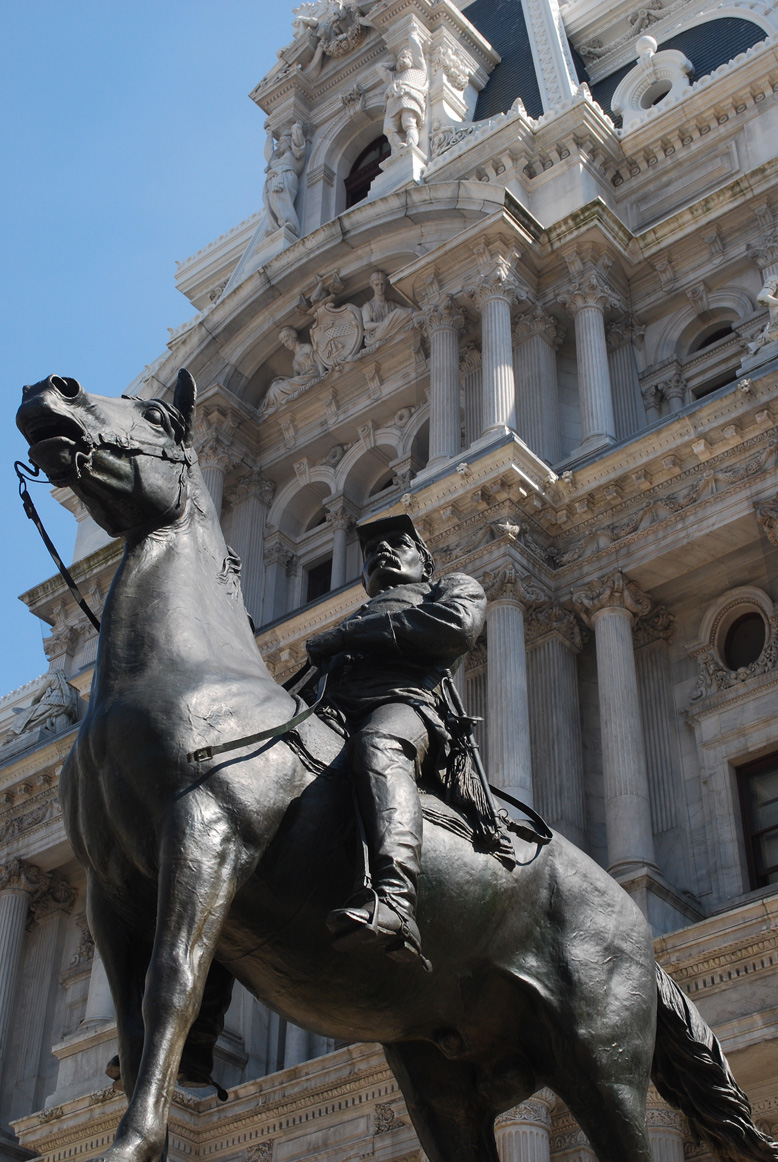
McClellan statue in front of Philadelphia City Hall

The New York Evening Post commented in McClellan's obituary, "Probably no soldier who did so little fighting has ever had his qualities as a commander so minutely, and we may add, so fiercely discussed." This fierce discussion has continued for over a century. McClellan is usually ranked in the lowest tier of Civil War commanders. However, the debate over McClellan's ability and talents remains the subject of much controversy among Civil War and military historians. He has been universally praised for his organizational abilities and for his very good relations with his troops. They referred to him affectionately as "Little Mac". Other nicknames McClellan received included "Young Napoleon" and "the little Napoleon". McClellan himself summed up his style of warfare in a draft of his memoirs:

It has always been my opinion that the true course in conducting military operations, is to make no movement until the preparations are as complete as circumstances permit, & never to fight a battle without some definite object worth the probable loss.

Stephen Sears notes that

There is indeed ample evidence that the terrible stresses of commanding men in battle, especially the beloved men of his beloved Army of the Potomac, left his moral courage in tatters. Under the pressure of his ultimate soldier's responsibility, the will to command deserted him. Glendale and Malvern Hill found him at the peak of his anguish during the Seven Days, and he fled those fields to escape the responsibility. At Antietam, where there was nowhere for him to flee to, he fell into a paralysis of indecision. Seen from a longer perspective, General McClellan could be both comfortable and successful performing as executive officer, and also, if somewhat less successfully, as grand strategist; as battlefield commander, however, he was simply in the wrong profession.

One of the reasons that McClellan's reputation has suffered is his own memoirs. Historian Allan Nevins wrote, "Students of history must always be grateful McClellan so frankly exposed his own weaknesses in this posthumous book." Doris Kearns Goodwin writes that a review of his personal correspondence during the war reveals a tendency for self-aggrandizement and unwarranted self-congratulation. His original draft was completed in 1881, but the only copy was destroyed by fire. He began to write another draft of what would be published posthumously, in 1887, as McClellan's Own Story. However, he died before it was half completed and his literary executor, William C. Prime, editor of the pro-McClellan New York Journal of Commerce, included excerpts from some 250 of McClellan's wartime letters to his wife, in which it had been his habit to reveal his innermost feelings and opinions in unbridled fashion.

Robert E. Lee, on being asked who was the ablest general on the Union side during the war, replied emphatically: "McClellan, by all odds!"

While McClellan's reputation has suffered over time, especially over the later half of the 20th century, there is a small but intense cadre of Civil War historians who believe that the general has been poorly served in at least four regards. First, McClellan proponents say that because the general was a conservative Democrat with great personal charisma, radical Republicans fearing his political potential deliberately undermined his field operations. Second, that as the radical Republicans were the true winners coming out of the Civil War, they were able to write its history, placing their principal political rival of the time, McClellan, in the worst possible light. Third, that historians eager to jump on the bandwagon of Lincoln as America's greatest political icon worked to outdo one another in shifting blame for early military failures from Lincoln and Secretary of War Edwin M. Stanton to McClellan. And fourth, that Lincoln and Stanton deliberately undermined McClellan because of his conciliatory stance towards the South, which might have resulted in a less destructive end to the war had Richmond fallen as a result of the Peninsula Campaign. Proponents of this school claim that McClellan is criticized more for his admittedly abrasive personality than for his actual field performance.

Several geographic features and establishments have been named for George B. McClellan. These include Fort McClellan in Alabama, McClellan Butte and McClellan Peak in the state of Washington, where he traveled while conducting the Pacific Railroad Survey in 1853, and a bronze equestrian statue honoring General McClellan in Washington, D.C. Another equestrian statue honors him in front of Philadelphia City Hall, while the McClellan Gate at Arlington National Cemetery is dedicated to him and displays his name. McClellan Park in Milbridge, Maine, was donated to the town by the general's son with the stipulation that it be named for the general. Camp McClellan, in Davenport, Iowa is a former Union Army camp established in August 1861 after the outbreak of the Civil War. The camp was the training grounds for recruits and a hospital for the wounded. McClellan Fitness Center is a United States Army gym located at Fort Eustis, Virginia near his Peninsula Campaign.

The Fire Department of New York operated a fireboat named George B. McClellan from 1904 to 1954, but this vessel was actually named after McClellan's son, who was Mayor of New York City, when the vessel was launched.

== Electoral history ==
1864 Democratic National Convention:

- George B. McClellan – 203 (90%)
- Thomas H. Seymour – 38 (17%)
- Horatio Seymour – 12 (5.3%)
- Charles O'Conor – 1 (0.4%)

1864 United States presidential election

- Abraham Lincoln/Andrew Johnson (National Union) – 2,218,388 (55.0%) and 212 electoral votes
- George B. McClellan/George H. Pendleton (Democratic) – 1,812,807 (45.0%) and 21 electoral votes (3 states carried)

New Jersey gubernatorial election, 1877:

- George B. McClellan (D) – 97,837 (51.7%)
- William Augustus Newell (R) – 85,094 (44.9%)

== Dates of rank ==
Insignia	Rank	Component	Date
	Brevet 2nd Lieutenant	Regular Army	July 2, 1846
	2nd Lieutenant	Regular Army	April 24, 1847
	Brevet 1st Lieutenant	Regular Army	August 20, 1847
	Brevet Captain	Regular Army	September 13, 1847
	1st Lieutenant	Regular Army	July 1, 1853
	Captain	Regular Army (resigned January 16, 1857)	March 4, 1855
	Major General	Volunteers	April 23, 1861
	Major General	Regular Army (resigned November 8, 1864)	May 14, 1861

== Selected works ==
- The Mexican War Diary of George B. McClellan (William Starr Myers, Editor). Princeton: Princeton University Press, 1917.
- Bayonet Exercise, or School of the Infantry Soldier, in the Use of the Musket in Hand-to-Hand Conflicts (translated from the French of Gomard), 1852. Reissued as Manual of Bayonet Exercise, Prepared for the Use of the Army of the United States. Philadelphia: J.B. Lippincott & Co., 1862.
- The Report of Captain George B. McClellan, One of the Officers Sent to the Seat of War in Europe, in 1855 and 1856, 1857. Reissued as The Armies of Europe, Comprising Descriptions in Detail of the Military Systems of England, France, Russia, Prussia, Austria, and Sardinia. Philadelphia: J.B. Lippincott & Co., 1861.
- European Cavalry, Including Details of the Organization of the Cavalry Service Among the Principal Nations of Europe. Philadelphia: J.B. Lippincott & Co., 1861.
- Exploration of the Red River of Louisiana in the Year 1852 (with Randolph B. Marcy). Washington: A.O.P. Nicholson, 1854.
- Regulations and Instructions for the Field Service of the United States Cavalry in Time of War, 1861. Reissued as Regulations and Instructions for the Field Service of the U.S. Cavalry in Time of War. Philadelphia: J.B. Lippincott & Co., 1862.
- McClellan's Own Story: The War for the Union, The Soldiers Who Fought It, The Civilians Who Directed It and His Relations to It and to Them (William C. Prime, Editor). New York: Charles L. Webster & Company, 1887.
- The Life, Campaigns, and Public Services of General George B McClellan. Philadelphia: T.B. Peterson & Brothers, 1864.
- The Democratic Platform, General McClellan's Letter of Acceptance. New York: Democratic National Committee, 1864.
- The Army of the Potomac, General McClellan's Report of Its Operations While Under His Command. New York: G.P. Putnam, 1864.
- Report of Major General George B McClellan, Upon the Organization of the Army of the Potomac and Its campaigns in Virginia and Maryland. Boston: Boston Courier, 1864.
- Letter of the Secretary of War by George Brinton McClellan. Washington: Government Printing Office, 1864.
- West Point Battle Monument, History of the Project to the Dedication of the Site (Oration of Major-General McClellan). New York: Sheldon & Co., 1864.

== See also ==
- List of American Civil War generals (Union)
- Conservative Democrat

== Notes ==
Military offices
Preceded by Irvin McDowell	Commander of the Army of the Potomac; 1861–1862	Succeeded by Ambrose Burnside
Preceded by Winfield Scott	Commanding General of the United States Army; 1861–1862	Succeeded by Henry Halleck
Party political offices
Preceded by Stephen A. Douglas; John C. Breckinridge	Democratic nominee for President of the United States; 1864	Succeeded by Horatio Seymour
Preceded by Joseph D. Bedle	Democratic nominee for Governor of New Jersey; 1877	Succeeded by George C. Ludlow
Political offices
Preceded by Joseph D. Bedle	Governor of New Jersey; 1878–1881	Succeeded by George C. Ludlow
Notes and references
1. The Democratic party split in 1860, producing two presidential candidates. Douglas was nominated by Northern Democrats; Breckinridge was nominated by Southern Democrats.
