= Mary Anna Jackson =

Widow of Stonewall Jackson (1831–1915)

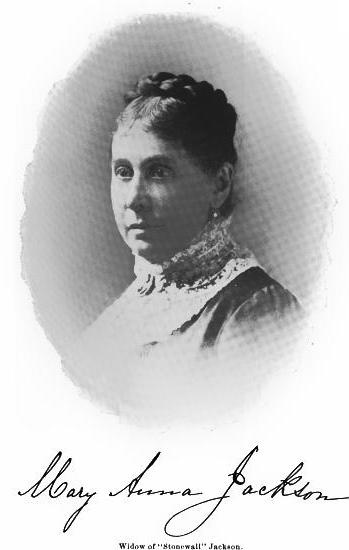
- Born: Mary Anna Morrison; July 21, 1831; Lincoln County, North Carolina, U.S.
- Died: March 24, 1915 (aged 83); Charlotte, North Carolina, U.S.
- Resting place: Oak Grove Cemetery (Lexington, Virginia)
- Other name: Esposita
- Known for: "Widow of the Confederacy"
- Spouse: Thomas J. "Stonewall" Jackson (m. 1857; died 1863)
- Children: 2

Mary Anna Morrison Jackson (July 21, 1831 – March 24, 1915) was the second wife, and subsequently widow, of Confederate Army general Thomas "Stonewall" Jackson. She was widely known as the "Widow of the Confederacy" for the next 50 years.

== Biography ==
Mary Anna Morrison – popularly known by friends and family as Anna – was born at Cottage Home, the family plantation near Lincolnton, North Carolina. Her father, Robert Hall Morrison, was a Presbyterian preacher and the first president of Davidson College, and her mother, Mary Graham, was the sister of William Alexander Graham, a Senator and later Governor of North Carolina, as well as a Senator in the Confederate Congress during the Civil War. Anna received her formal education at Salem Academy (now Salem Academy and College) from 1847 to 1849.

Anna was introduced to Thomas Jackson by her sister Isabella, the wife of Daniel Harvey Hill, a professor at Washington College (now Washington and Lee University) in Lexington, Virginia; Jackson had recently accepted a teaching position at the nearby Virginia Military Institute. In 1853, Jackson had married Elinor Junkin, the daughter of Washington College's president, Dr. George Junkin; she died in childbirth the following October. Around Christmas 1856, Jackson called on Anna in North Carolina while on furlough from VMI. They married in the front parlor of Cottage Home on July 16, 1857. They purchased a brick house on East Washington Street in Lexington, where they lived from 1858 to the outbreak of the Civil War in 1861. Their first daughter, Mary Graham Jackson, died in infancy in 1858; their second, Julia Laura, was born in Charlotte on November 23, 1862, just before the Battle of Fredericksburg.

Anna lived with relatives in Charlotte during the war, while several members of her family – including her husband, her brother-in-law D.H. Hill, and her younger brother Joseph Graham Morrison, who served as Jackson's aide-de-camp – served in the Confederate Army. She visited her husband at his headquarters house in Winchester during the winter of 1861–62, at his winter headquarters at Moss Neck Manor in the spring of 1863, and again at Guinea Station after he was wounded at the Battle of Chancellorsville. She was at Jackson's bedside when he died on May 10, 1863.

=== After Stonewall Jackson's death ===
Anna never remarried after her husband's death; she moved back into Cottage Home with her father after the war, taking Jackson's horse Little Sorrel with her. She moved to Charlotte in 1873 while Julia completed her education. After Julia married William Christian in 1885, Anna lived with him in Richmond, then briefly in San Diego, California, before returning to North Carolina. Julia had two children of her own before she died in 1889, at the age of twenty-six. Anna frequently attended Confederate veterans' reunions and wrote two books on her husband, a memoir and a collection of their letters.

Anna served as the first regent of the Mecklenburg Chapter of the Daughters of the American Revolution.

Anna Jackson died in Charlotte on March 24, 1915, at the age of eighty-three. She was buried with full military honors next to her husband and daughters at Oak Grove Cemetery in Lexington.

== In popular culture ==
Jackson is the subject of the Harnett Kane 1957 novel, The Gallant Mrs. Stonewall, based on the Jacksons' early years together.

She was portrayed by Kali Rocha in the 2003 film Gods and Generals.
