= Stonewall Jackson's Headquarters Museum =

Historic house in Virginia, United States

- Stonewall Jackson's Headquarters
- U.S. National Register of Historic Places
- U.S. National Historic Landmark
- U.S. Historic district – Contributing property
- Virginia Landmarks Register
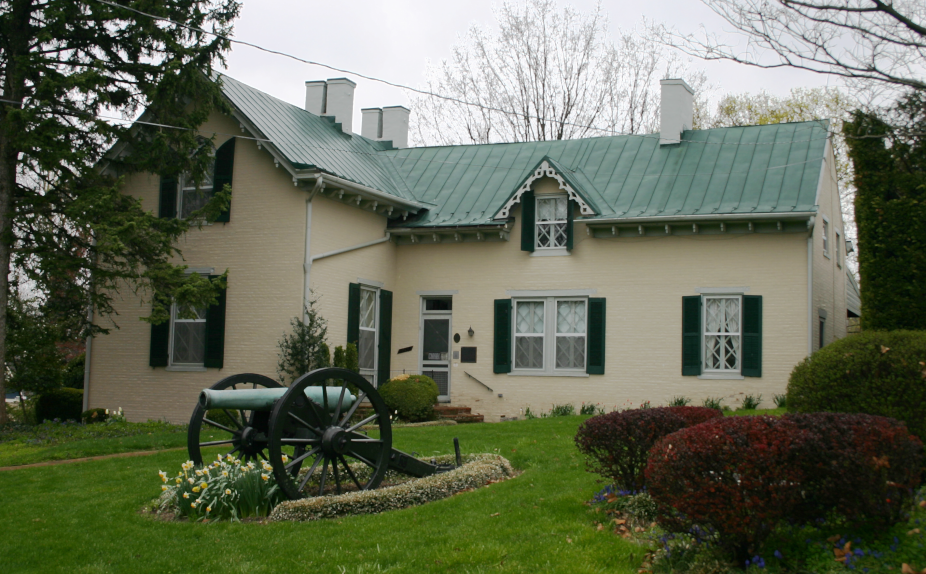
- (2007)

- Location within Virginia Location within the United States
- Location: 415 N. Braddock Street; Winchester, Virginia
- Coordinates: 39°11′23″N 78°9′58″W
- Built: 1861
- Architectural style: Gothic Revival
- Part of: Winchester Historic District (ID80004318)
- NRHP reference No.: 67000027
- VLR No.: 138-0033

Significant dates
- Added to NRHP: May 28, 1967
- Designated NHL: May 28, 1967
- Designated CP: March 4, 1980
- Designated VLR: September 9, 1969

The Stonewall Jackson's Headquarters Museum is a historic house located at 415 North Braddock Street in the Historic District of Winchester, Virginia.

== History ==
The Gothic Revival style house was built in 1854 by local dentist William McP. Fuller, who named it "Alta Vista" for its scenic view over open hillsides facing east across Winchester. In 1856, Fuller sold it to Lieutenant Colonel Lewis Tilghman Moore, commander of the 31st Virginia Militia. Later, while commanding the 4th Virginia Infantry in the Confederate States Army, Moore offered his home to serve as headquarters for Major General Thomas J. "Stonewall" Jackson. Jackson moved into the house in November 1861, shortly after taking command of the Valley District of the Department of Northern Virginia. Jackson was joined by his wife, Mary Anna, in December 1861. From this house, Jackson planned his Shenandoah Valley defenses and campaigns, starting with the Romney Expedition. The Jacksons lived in the house until March 1862, when the General Jackson left Winchester to begin his Valley Campaign.

While living here, the Jacksons became very fond of the people and culture of Winchester, and referred to it as their "winter home", hoping to settle here after the Civil War. In a letter to Anna shortly after he arrived, Jackson commented:

The situation is beautiful, the building is of a cottage style and contains six rooms. I have two rooms, one above the other. The lower room, or office, has a matting on the floor, a large fine table, six chairs, and a piano. The walls are papered with elegant gilt paper. I don't remember to have ever seen a more beautiful papering, and there are five paintings hanging on the walls. … The upper room is neat, but not a full story and … remarkable for being heated in a peculiar manner, by a flue from the office below. Through the blessing of our ever-kind Heavenly Father, I am quite comfortable. – Letter from Jackson to his wife Anna, November 16, 1861

In the 1960s, the home was purchased and converted into a museum, and includes many possessions and artifacts belonging to Jackson. One of Colonel Moore's descendants was the actress Mary Tyler Moore, who helped to pay for the restorations of the home to become a museum – including replica wallpaper matching the original to which Jackson referred above.

The house was designated a National Historic Landmark in 1967.

== See also ==
- Stonewall Jackson House, in Lexington, Virginia
- Winchester in the Civil War
- Valley District
- List of National Historic Landmarks in Virginia
- National Register of Historic Places listings in Winchester, Virginia
