= Thomas Jonathan Jackson Christian Jr. =

United States Army Air Forces officer

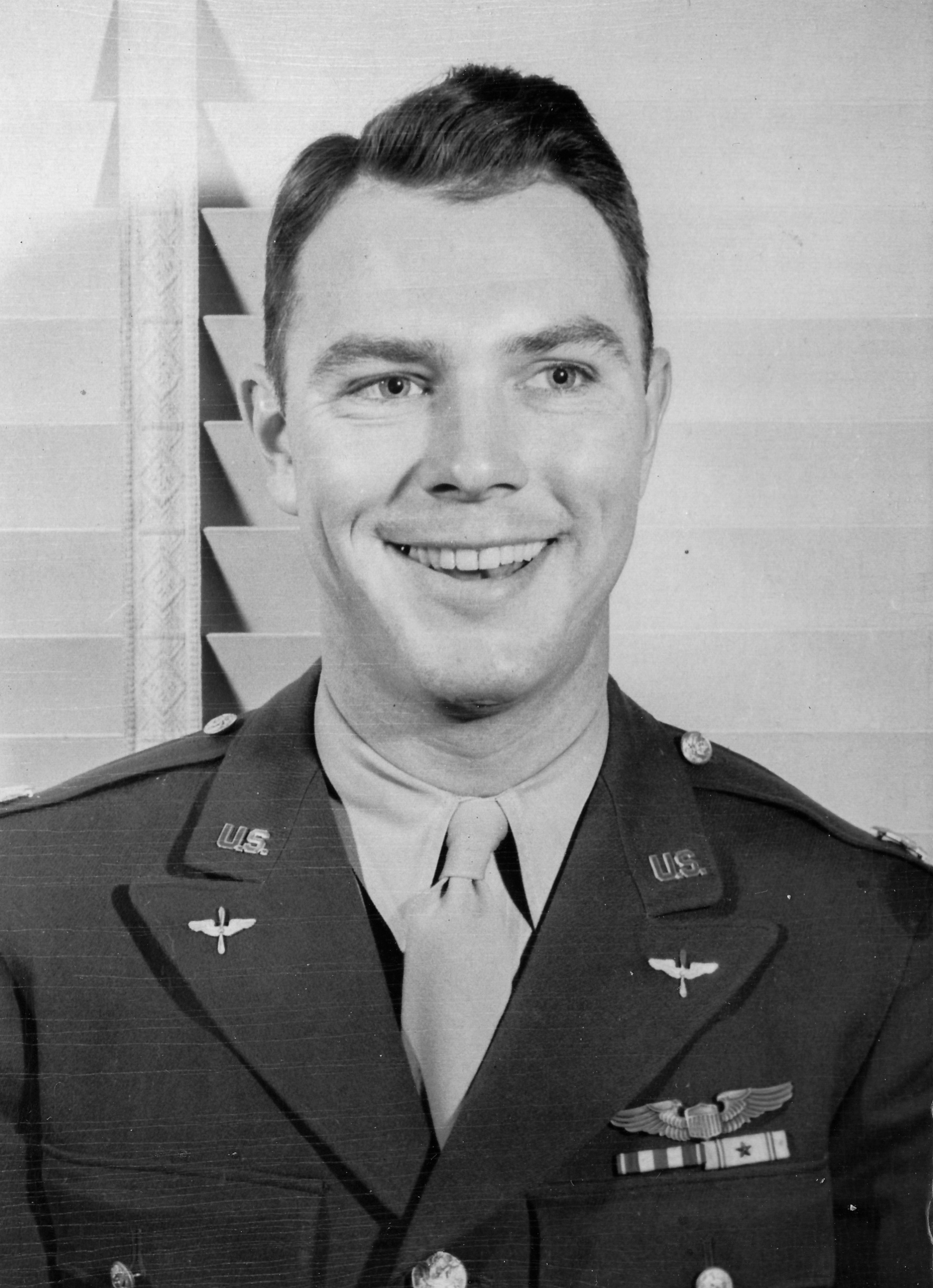
- Colonel Jack Christian
- Born: November 19, 1915; San Francisco, California, U.S.
- Died: August 12, 1944 (aged 28); Boisleux-au-Mont, France
- Burial place: Texas State Cemetery
- Relatives: Thomas Jonathan Jackson (great-grandfather)
- Military career
- Allegiance: United States of America
- Branch: United States Army Air Forces
- Service years: 1939–1944
- Rank: Colonel
- Nickname: Jack
- Service number: O-21782
- Units: 19th Bombardment Group; 67th Pursuit Squadron
- Commands: 361st Fighter Group
- Conflicts: World War II
- Awards: Air Medal with 3 oak leaf clusters American Defense Medal; Asiatic-Pacific Campaign Medal; Croix de Guerre; Distinguished Flying Cross with 1 oak leaf cluster European-African-Middle Eastern Campaign Medal; Philippine Defense Ribbon; Purple Heart; Silver Star; World War II Victory Medal

Thomas Jonathan Jackson Christian Jr. (19 November 1915 – 12 August 1944) was a colonel in the United States Army Air Forces and commanding officer of the 361st Fighter Group during World War II. He was the great-grandson of American Civil War General Stonewall Jackson.

== Early life and education ==
Christian was born in San Francisco, California on 19 November 1915. His father was brigadier-general Thomas Jonathan Jackson Christian Sr.

== Pilot training ==
Christian graduated from the United States Military Academy at West Point in 1939 and entered the Field Artillery Branch. He later joined the United States Army Air Corps. In 1940, after pilot training, he became an instructor at Randolph Field, Texas.

== World War II ==
Christian was transferred to the 19th Bombardment Group at Clark Field in the Philippines in March 1941. During the Battle of the Philippines he was reassigned to Bataan and then Australia.

He was assigned to the 67th Pursuit Squadron at Henderson Field (Guadalcanal) in the Solomon Islands and flew a P-39 Airacobra.

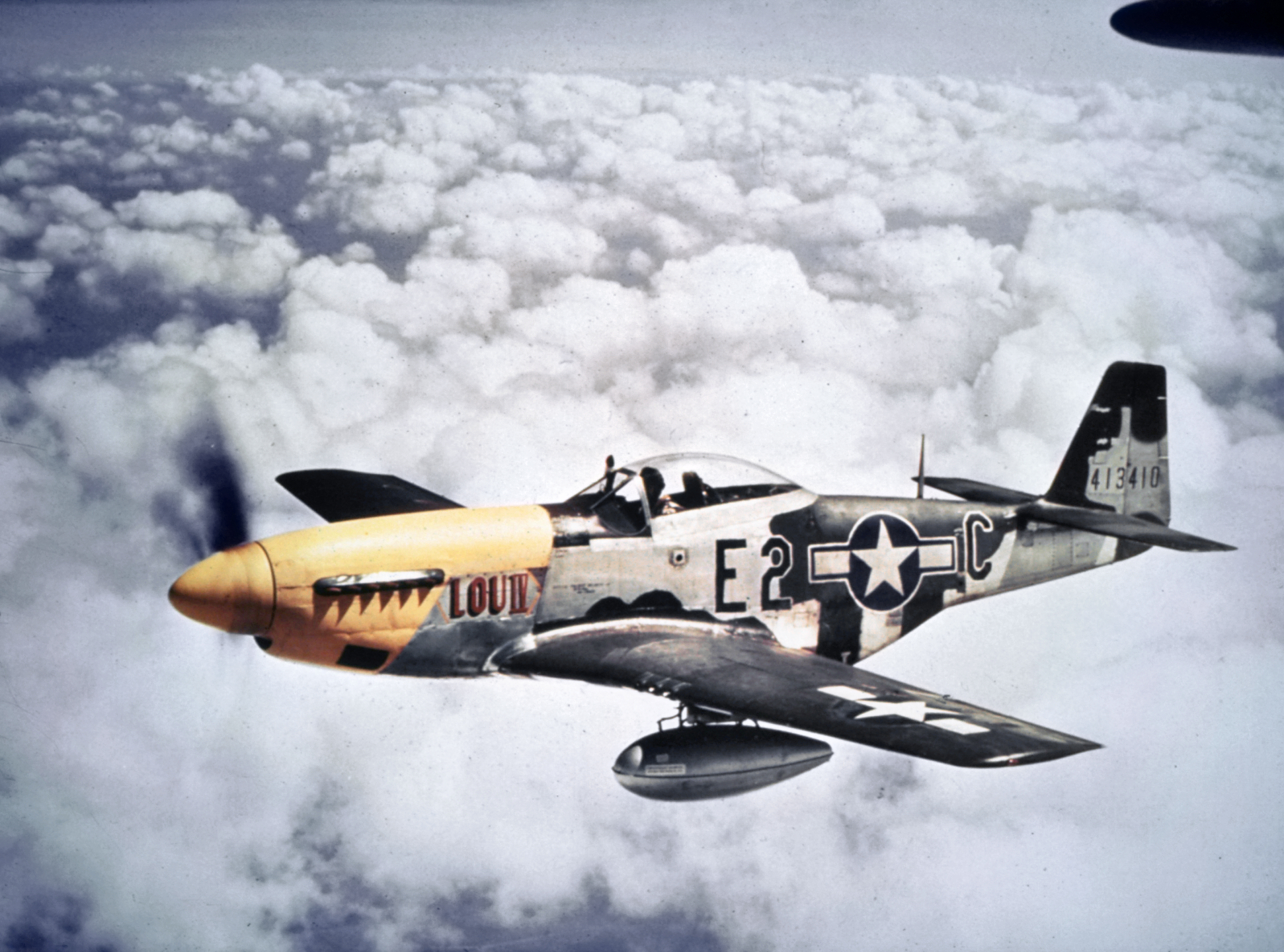
Christian's P-51 Mustang aircraft P-51D-5-NA s/n 44-13410 "Lou IV"

He returned to the United States and was given command of the newly formed 361st Fighter Group (as a major) in February 1943. The group moved to RAF Bottisham in November 1943. He was promoted to colonel in March 1944.

While on his 78th mission against the Germans, he was shot down and killed on 12 August 1944 near Boisleux-au-Mont, France.

== Awards and decorations ==
Christian was awarded the Silver Star, the Distinguished Flying Cross with Oak Leaf Cluster, the Air Medal with three Oak Leaf Clusters, and the Purple Heart.

== See also ==
- Nathan Bedford Forrest III, another great-grandson of a notable Confederate general who was a high-ranking USAAF pilot killed in action in the European Theater of Operations in World War II
