= Guinea, Virginia =

Unincorporated community in Virginia, United States

- Unincorporated community
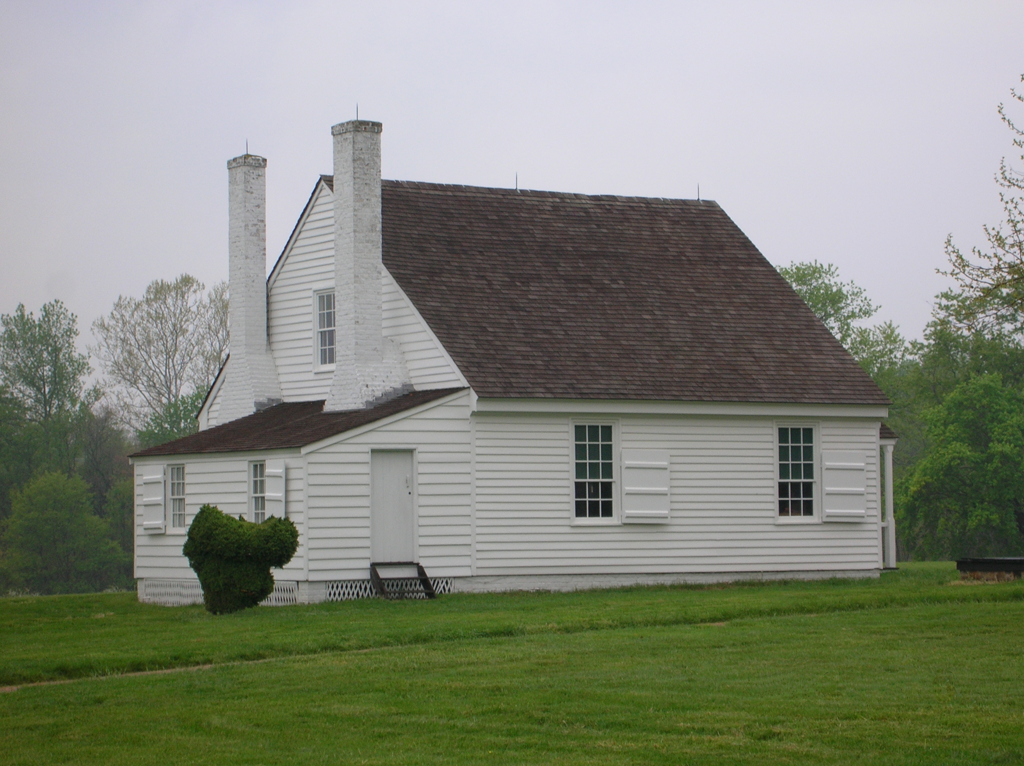
- The Stonewall Jackson Death Site in Guinea, Virginia

- Location within Virginia Location within the United States
- Coordinates: 38°08′37″N 77°26′16″W
- Country: United States
- State: Virginia
- County: Caroline
- Elevation: 135 ft (41 m)
- Time zone: UTC-5 (Eastern (EST))
  - Summer (DST): UTC-4 (EDT)
- Area code: 804
- GNIS feature ID: 1495630

Guinea is an unincorporated community in Caroline County, Virginia, United States. Guinea is 8.5 miles (13.7 km) northwest of Bowling Green. The modern spelling of the name has been altered from the earlier "Guiney" or "Guiney's", so called after an old Caroline County family, the Guineys (also spelled Guinney, Gwinny, or Ginny in various records). Guinea was the site of a Civil War era railroad station on the Richmond, Fredericksburg and Potomac Railroad known as Guiney's Station.

About four thousand captured Union soldiers were collected at Guiney's station after the Battle of Chancellorsville.

General Robert E. Lee ordered the wounded General Stonewall Jackson to be taken away from the field hospital at the front lines near Chancellorsville to a safer location at Guiney's Station. The location is notable as being the place where Jackson died on May 10, 1863. His remains were placed on a one-car train at Guiney's Station on the morning of May 11 for transport to Richmond. Jackson was later interred in Lexington.

== See also ==
- Moss Neck Manor
