= Confederate States Army =

Land warfare force of the Confederate States

- Battle flag of the Army of Northern Virginia
- Founded: February 28, 1861
- Disbanded: May 26, 1865
- Country: Confederate States
- Type: Army
- Size: 1,082,119 total who served: 464,646 peak in 1863
- Part of: War Department
- Colors: Cadet Gray
- March: "Dixie"
- Conflicts: American Civil War; List of American Civil War battles; Cortina Troubles; Indian Wars

Commanders
- Commander in Chief: Jefferson Davis (1861–65)
- General in Chief: General Robert E. Lee (1865)

The Confederate States Army (CSA), also called the Confederate army or the Southern army, was the military land force of the Confederate States of America (commonly referred to as the Confederacy) during the American Civil War (1861–1865), fighting against the United States (also known as Union) forces to support the rebellion of the Southern states. On February 28, 1861, the Provisional Confederate Congress established a provisional volunteer army and gave control over military operations and authority for mustering state forces and volunteers to the newly chosen Confederate States president, Jefferson Davis (1808–1889). Davis was a graduate of the United States Military Academy, on the Hudson River at West Point, New York, and colonel of a volunteer regiment during the Mexican–American War (1846–1848). He had also been a United States senator from Mississippi and served as U.S. Secretary of War under 14th president Franklin Pierce. On March 1, 1861, on behalf of the new Confederate States government, Davis assumed control of the military situation at Charleston Harbor in Charleston, South Carolina, where South Carolina state militia had besieged the longtime Federal Fort Sumter in Charleston harbor, held by a small U.S. Army garrison under the command of Major Robert Anderson (1805–1871). By March 1861, the Provisional Congress of the Confederate States meeting in the temporary capital of Montgomery, Alabama, expanded the provisional military forces and established a more permanent regular Confederate States Army.

An accurate count of the total number of individuals who served in the Military forces of the Confederate States (Army, Navy and Marine Corps) is not possible due to incomplete and destroyed/burned Confederate records and archives. Estimates of the number of Confederate soldiers, sailors and marines are between 750,000 and over 1,000,000 troops. This does not include an unknown number of enslaved Black people who were pressed into performing various tasks for the army, such as the construction of fortifications and defenses or driving wagons. Since these figures include estimates of the total number of soldiers who served at any time during the war, they do not represent the size of the army at any given date. These numbers also do not include sailors/marines who served in the Confederate States Navy.

Although most of the soldiers who fought in the American Civil War were volunteers, both sides by 1862 resorted to conscription as a means to supplement the volunteer soldiers. Although exact records are unavailable, estimates of the percentage of Confederate Army soldiers who were drafted are about double the 6 percent of Union Army soldiers who were drafted.

According to the National Park Service, "Soldier demographics for the Confederate Army are not available due to incomplete and destroyed enlistment records." Their estimates of Confederate military personnel deaths are about 94,000 killed in battle, 164,000 deaths from disease, and 25,976 deaths in Union prison camps. One estimate of the total Confederate wounded is 194,026. In comparison, the best estimates of the number of Union military personnel deaths are 110,100 killed in battle, 224,580 deaths from disease, and 30,218 deaths in Confederate prison camps. The estimated figure for Union Army wounded is 275,174.

The main Confederate armies, the Army of Northern Virginia under General Robert E. Lee and the remnants of the Army of Tennessee and various other units under General Joseph E. Johnston, surrendered to the U.S. on April 9, 1865 (officially April 12), and April 18, 1865 (officially April 26). Other Confederate forces further south and west surrendered between April 16, 1865, and June 28, 1865. By the end of the war, more than 100,000 Confederate soldiers had deserted, and some estimates put the number as high as one-third of all Confederate soldiers. The Confederacy's government effectively dissolved when it evacuated the four-year old capital of Richmond, Virginia, on April 3, 1865, and fled southwest by railroad train with President Jefferson Davis and members of his cabinet. It gradually continued moving southwestward first to Lynchburg, Virginia, and lost communication with its remaining military commanders, soon exerting no control over the remaining armies. They were eventually caught and captured near Irwinville, Georgia, a month later in May 1865.

== Prelude ==
By the time Abraham Lincoln took office as President of the United States on March 4, 1861, the seven seceding slave states had formed the Confederate States. They seized federal property, including nearly all U.S. Army forts, within their borders. Lincoln was determined to hold the forts remaining under U.S. control when he took office, especially Fort Sumter in the harbor of Charleston, South Carolina. On February 28, shortly before Lincoln was sworn in as president, the Provisional Confederate Congress had authorized the organization of a large Provisional Army of the Confederate States (PACS).

Under orders from Confederate President Jefferson Davis, C.S. troops under the command of General Pierre Gustave Toutant / P. G. T. Beauregard military forces surrounding the city harbor began bombarding Fort Sumter on April 12–13, 1861 and forced its capitulation on April 14. The remaining loyal United States in the North, outraged by the Confederacy's attack, demanded war. It rallied behind new 16th President Lincoln's call on April 15 for all the loyal states to send their state militia units and volunteer troops to reinforce and protect the national federal capital of Washington, D.C., to recapture the various forts, arsenals, shipyards and other seized federal installations from the secessionists, to put down and suppress the rebellion and to save the Union. Four more upper border slave states (North Carolina, Tennessee, Arkansas and finally Virginia) then joined the Confederacy, making eleven seceded states, rather than fight fellow Southerners. The Confederacy then moved its national capital from temporary Montgomery, Alabama to the state capital of Virginia in Richmond. Both the United States and the Confederate States began in earnest to raise large, mostly volunteer, armies, with the opposing objectives: putting down the rebellion and preserving the Union on the one hand, and establishing Southern independence from the northern United States on the other.

== Establishment ==
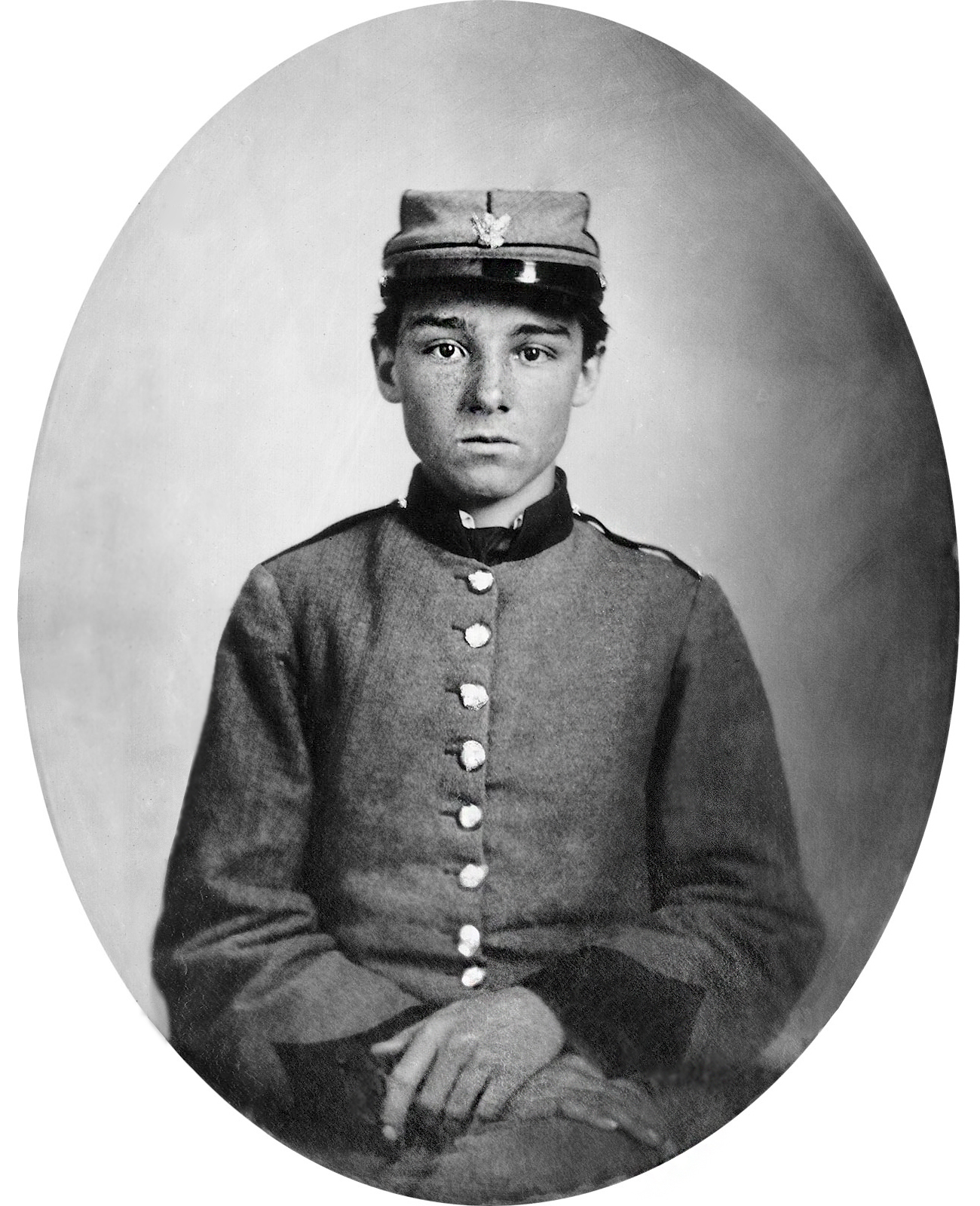
Private Edwin Francis Jemison, whose image became one of the most famous portraits of the young soldiers of the war

The Confederate States Congress provided for a regular Confederate States Army, patterned after its parent in the United States Army (established 1775 / 1789). It was to consist of a large provisional force to exist only in time of war and a small permanent regular army. The provisional, volunteer army was established by an act of the Provisional Confederate Congress passed on February 28, 1861, one week before the act which established the permanent regular army organization, passed on March 6. Although the two forces were to exist concurrently, little was done to organize the Confederate regular army.

- The Provisional Army of the Confederate States (PACS) began organizing on April 27. Virtually all regular, volunteer, and conscripted men preferred to enter this organization since officers could achieve a higher rank in the Provisional Army than they could in the Regular Army. If the war had ended successfully for them, the Confederates intended that the PACS would be disbanded, leaving only the ACSA.
- The Army of the Confederate States of America (ACSA) was the regular army and was authorized to include 15,015 men, including 744 officers, but this level was never achieved: only 1600 men and officers ever served at in the Regular Army. The organization of the ACSA did not proceed beyond the appointment and confirmation of some officers and staff departments such as the Corps of Engineers. The highest-ranking Confederate generals, such as Samuel Cooper and Robert E. Lee, were enrolled in the ACSA to ensure that they outranked all militia officers. Some PACS units consisting of companies from multiple states received "Confederate" designations (i.e. 1st Confederate Infantry), but they were not part of the ACSA.

Members of all the military forces of the Confederate States (the army, the navy, and the marine corps) are often referred to as "Confederates", and members of the Confederate army were referred to as "Confederate soldiers". Supplementing the Confederate army were the various state militias of the Confederacy:

- Confederate States State Militias were organized and commanded by the state governments, similar to those authorized by the United States' Militia Act of 1792. Some of these militia forces, in the early days of the Confederacy, had operated as stand alone military forces before being incorporated into the Confederate Army; one of the more well known was the Provisional Army of Virginia.

=== Control and conscription ===
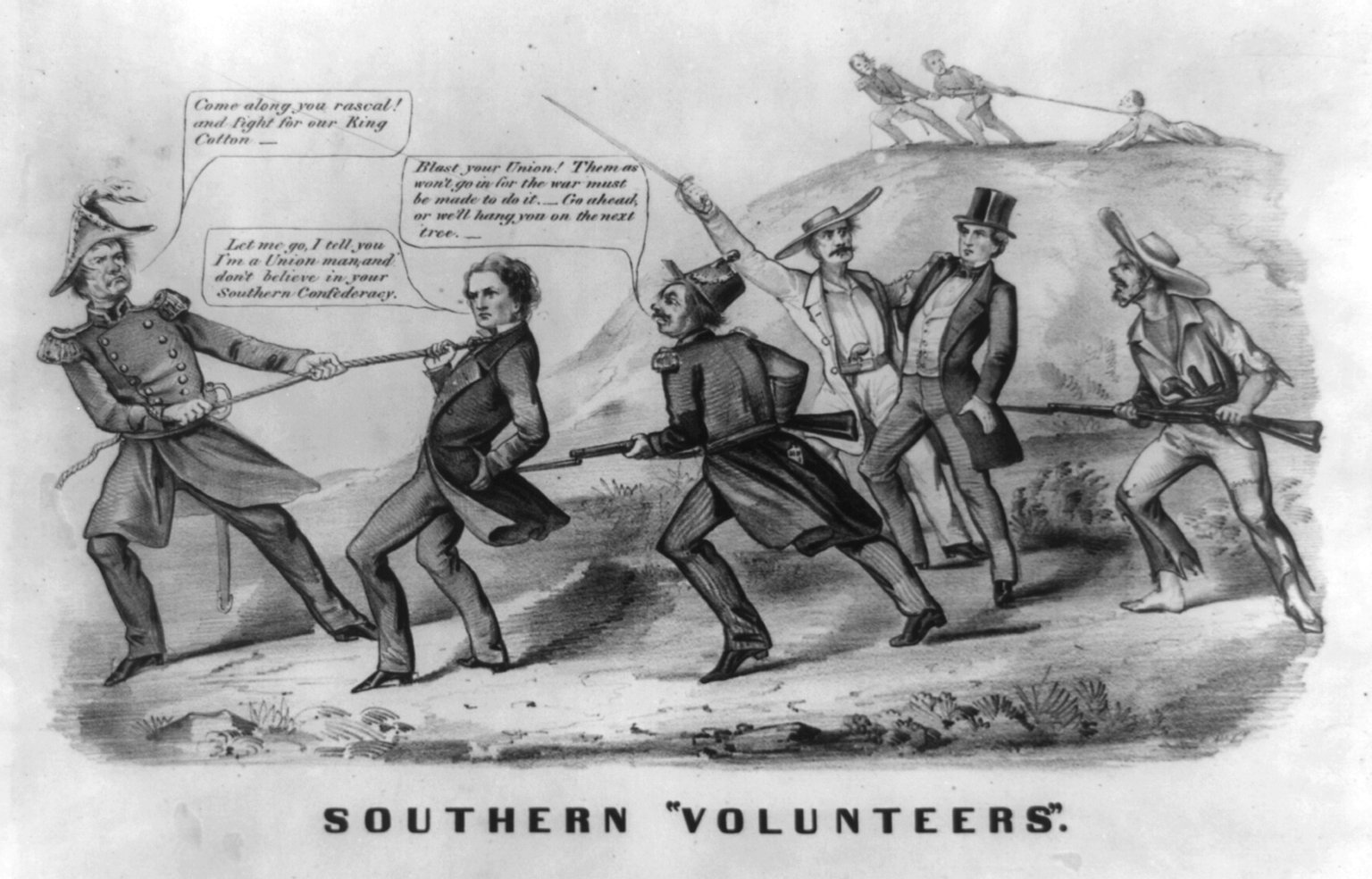
A cartoon from the war, showing the Confederates forcibly drafting a Southern Unionist man into the Confederate army. The Unionist man objects, with the Confederates threatening to lynch him if he does not comply.

Control and operation of the Confederate army were administered by the Confederate States War Department, which was established by the Confederate Provisional Congress in an act on February 21, 1861. The Confederate Congress gave control over military operations, and authority for mustering state forces and volunteers to the President of the Confederate States of America on February 28, 1861, and March 6, 1861. On March 8, the Confederate Congress passed a law that authorized President Davis to issue proclamations to call up no more than 100,000 men. The C.S. War Department asked for 8,000 volunteers on March 9, 20,000 on April 8, and 49,000 on and after April 16. Davis proposed an army of 100,000 soldiers in his message to Congress on April 29.

On August 8, 1861, the Confederacy called for 400,000 volunteers to serve for one or three years. Eight months later in April 1862, the Confederacy passed the first conscription law in either Confederate or Union history, the Conscription Act, which made all able bodied white men between the ages of 18 and 35 liable for a three-year term of service in the Provisional Army. It also extended the terms of enlistment for all one-year soldiers to three years. Men employed in certain occupations considered to be most valuable for the home front (such as railroad and river workers, civil officials, telegraph operators, miners, druggists and teachers) were exempt from the draft. The act was amended twice in 1862. On September 27, the maximum age of conscription was extended to 45. On October 11, the Confederate States Congress passed the so-called "Twenty Negro Law", which exempted anyone who owned 20 or more slaves, a move that caused deep resentment among conscripts who did not own slaves.

The C.S. Congress enacted several more amendments throughout the war to address losses suffered in battle as well as the United States' greater supply of manpower. In December 1863, it abolished the previous practice of allowing a rich drafted man to hire a substitute to take his place in the ranks. Substitution had also been practiced in the United States, leading to similar resentment from the lower classes. In February 1864, the age limits were extended to between 17 and 50. Challenges to the subsequent acts came before five state supreme courts; all five upheld them.

== Morale and motivations ==
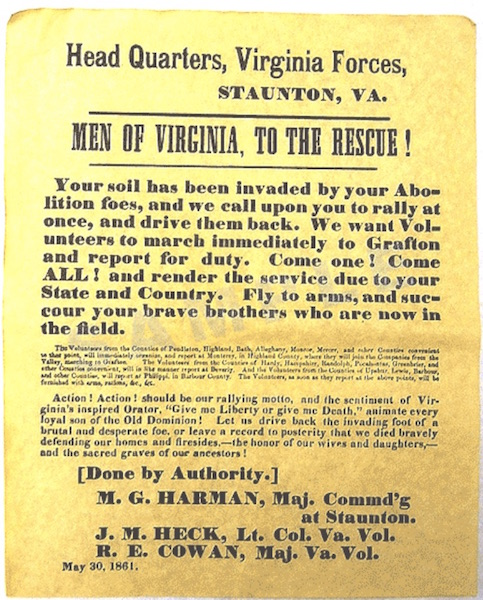
An 1861 Confederate recruiting poster from Virginia, urging men to join the Confederate cause and fight off the Union Army, which it refers to as a "brutal and desperate foe"

In his 2010 book Major Problems in the Civil War, historian Michael Perman says that historians are of two minds on why millions of men seemed so eager to fight, suffer and die over four years:

Some historians emphasize that Civil War soldiers were driven by political ideology, holding firm beliefs about the importance of liberty, Union, or state rights, or about the need to protect or to destroy slavery. Others point to less overtly political reasons to fight, such as the defense of one's home and family, or the honor and brotherhood to be preserved when fighting alongside other men. Most historians agree that, no matter what he thought about when he went into the war, the experience of combat affected him profoundly and sometimes affected his reasons for continuing to fight.

— Michael Perman, Major Problems in the Civil War and Reconstruction (2010), p. 178.

Educated soldiers drew upon their knowledge of American history to justify their costs. Historian James M. McPherson says:

Confederate and Union soldiers interpreted the heritage of 1776 in opposite ways. Confederates professed to fight for liberty and independence from a too radical government; Unionists said they fought to preserve the nation conceived in liberty from dismemberment and destruction ... The rhetoric of liberty that had permeated the letters of Confederate volunteers in 1861, grew even stronger as the war progressed.

Before and during the Civil War, the popular press of Richmond, including its five major newspapers, sought to inspire a sense of patriotism, Confederate identity, and the moral high ground in the southern population.

=== Religion ===
The southern churches met the shortage of Army chaplains by sending missionaries. The Southern Baptists sent a total of 78 missionaries, starting in 1862. Presbyterians were even more active, with 112 missionaries sent in early 1865. Other missionaries were funded and supported by the Episcopalians, Methodists, and Lutherans. One result was wave after wave of Christian revivals in the Army, religion playing a major part in the lives of Confederate soldiers. Some men with a weak religious affiliation became committed Christians, and saw their military service in terms of satisfying God's wishes. Religion strengthened the soldiers' loyalty to their comrades and the Confederacy. Military historian Samuel J. Watson argues that Christian faith was a major factor in combat motivation. According to his analysis, the soldiers' faith was consoling for the loss of comrades; it was a shield against fear; it helped reduce drinking and fighting in the ranks; it enlarged the soldiers' community of close friends and helped compensate for their long-term separation from home.

=== Slavery and white supremacism ===
In his 1997 book For Cause and Comrades, which examines the motivations of the American Civil War's soldiers, noted Princeton University war historian and author James M. McPherson (born 1936), contrasts the views of Confederate soldiers regarding slavery with those of the colonial American revolutionaries of the earlier 18th century. He stated that while the American rebel colonists of the 1770s saw an incongruity between owning slaves on the one hand, and proclaiming to be fighting for liberty on the other, the later Confederacy's soldiers did not, as the Confederate ideology of white supremacy negated any contradiction between the two:

Unlike many slaveholders in the age of Thomas Jefferson, Confederate soldiers from slaveholding families expressed no feelings of embarrassment or inconsistency in fighting for their liberty while holding other people in slavery. Indeed, white supremacy and the right of property in slaves were at the core of the ideology for which Confederate soldiers fought.

— James M. McPherson, For Cause and Comrades: Why Men Fought in the Civil War (1997), p. 106.

McPherson states that Confederate States Army soldiers did not discuss the issue of slavery as often as the opposing United States Army soldiers did, because most Confederate soldiers readily accepted as an obvious fact that they were fighting to perpetuate slavery and thus did not feel the need to debate over it:

[O]nly 20 percent of the sample of 429 Southern soldiers explicitly voiced proslavery convictions in their letters or diaries. As one might expect, a much higher percentage of soldiers from slaveholding families than from non-slaveholding families expressed such a purpose: 33 percent, compared with 12 percent. Ironically, the proportion of Union soldiers who wrote about the slavery question was greater, as the next chapter will show. There is a ready explanation for this apparent paradox. Emancipation was a salient issue for Union soldiers because it was controversial. Slavery was less salient for most Confederate soldiers because it was not controversial. They took slavery for granted as one of the Southern 'rights' and institutions for which they fought, and did not feel compelled to discuss it.

— James M. McPherson, For Cause and Comrades: Why Men Fought in the Civil War (1997), pp. 109–110.

Continuing, retired Professor McPherson also stated that of the hundreds of Confederate soldiers' letters he had examined, none of them contained any anti-slavery sentiment whatsoever:

Although only 20 percent of the soldiers avowed explicit proslavery purposes in their letters and diaries, none at all dissented from that view.

— James M. McPherson, For Cause and Comrades: Why Men Fought in the Civil War (1997), p. 110, emphasis in original.

McPherson admits some flaws in his sampling of letters. Soldiers from slaveholding families were overrepresented by 100%:

Nonslaveholding farmers are underrepresented in the Confederate sample. Indeed, while about one-third of all Confederate soldiers belonged to slaveholding families, slightly more than two-thirds of the sample whose slaveholding status is known did so.

— James M. McPherson, For Cause and Comrades: Why Men Fought in the Civil War (1997), p. ix.

In some cases, Confederate men were motivated to join the army in response to the United States' actions regarding its opposition to slavery. After the U.S. President Abraham Lincoln issued the Emancipation Proclamation in 1862–1863, some Confederate soldiers welcomed the move, as they believed it would strengthen pro-slavery sentiment in the Confederacy, and thus lead to greater enlistment of soldiers in the Confederate armies.

One Confederate soldier from the West in Texas gave his reasons for fighting for the Confederacy, stating that "we are fighting for our property", contrasting this with the motivations of Union soldiers, who, he claimed, were fighting for the "flimsy and abstract idea that a negro is equal to an Anglo American". One Louisianan artilleryman stated, "I never want to see the day when a negro is put on an equality with a white person. There is too many free niggers ... now to suit me, let alone having four millions." A North Carolinian soldier stated, "[A] white man is better than a nigger."

Decades later in 1894, Virginian and former famous Confederate cavalry leader, John S. Mosby (1833–1916), reflecting on his role in the war, stated in a letter to a friend that "I've always understood that we went to war on account of the thing we quarreled with the North about. I've never heard of any other cause than slavery." As stated by researcher / authors Andrew Hall, Connor Huff and Shiro Kuriwaki in the article Wealth, Slaveownership, and Fighting for the Confederacy: An Empirical Study of the American Civil War, research done using an 1862 Georgia Lottery showed that rich white Southern men actually enlisted at a higher rate than poor men because they had more to lose. Slavery helped provide them with wealth and power, and they felt that the Civil War would destroy everything that they had if they lost because they saw slavery as the foundation of their wealth, which was under threat and caused them to fight hard.

=== Desertion ===
At many points during the war, and especially near the end, the Confederate soldiers' families back home were in deep trouble. Many faced starvation and the depredations of roving bands of marauders. Conditions were worst in North Carolina. Many soldiers went home temporarily (A.W.O.L. – "Absent Without Official Leave") and quietly returned when their family problems had been resolved. By September 1864, however, President Davis publicly admitted that two-thirds of the soldiers were absent, "most of them without leave". The problem escalated rapidly after that, and fewer and fewer men returned. Soldiers who were fighting in defense of their homes realized that they had to desert to fulfill that duty. Historian Mark Weitz argues that the official count of 103,400 deserters is too low. He concludes that most of the desertions came because the soldier felt he owed a higher duty to his own family than to the Confederacy.

Confederate policies regarding desertion could be severe. For example, on August 19, 1862, famed General Thomas J. "Stonewall" Jackson (1824–1863), approved the court-martial sentence of execution for three soldiers for desertion, rejecting pleas for clemency from the soldiers' regimental commander. General Jackson's goal was to maintain discipline in a volunteer army whose homes were under threat of enemy occupation. While upwards of 100,000 soldiers may have deserted Confederate arms for varying periods and at varying times during the war, it has been estimated that the Confederate Army only executed about 230 deserters over the course of the war, with others suggesting that the figure may have been somewhat higher. This contrasts with approximately 147 soldiers executed by the Union Army for desertion, which was confronted with an overall higher number of deserters.

Historians of the Civil War have emphasized how soldiers from poor families deserted because they were urgently needed at home. Local pressures mounted as Union forces occupied more and more Confederate territory, putting more and more families at risk of hardship. One Confederate Army officer at the time noted, "The deserters belong almost entirely to the poorest class of non-slave-holders whose labor is indispensable to the daily support of their families" and that "When the father, husband or son is forced into the service, the suffering at home with them is inevitable. It is not in the nature of these men to remain quiet in the ranks under such circumstances."

Some soldiers also deserted for ideological reasons. A growing threat to the solidarity of the Confederacy was dissatisfaction in the Appalachian Mountains districts caused by lingering Unionism and a distrust of the power wielded by the slave-holding class. Many of their soldiers deserted, returned home, and formed a military force that fought off Regular Army units trying to capture and punish them. North Carolina lost nearly a quarter of its soldiers (24,122) to desertion. This was the highest rate of desertion of any Confederate state.

Young Samuel Clemens (1835–1910, later to be known as Mark Twain) soon deserted the Southern army long before he became a world-famous writer, journalist and lecturer, but he often commented upon that episode in his life comically, even writing a book about it. Author Neil Schmitz has examined the deep unease Twain felt about losing his honor, his fear of facing death as a soldier, and his rejection of a Southern identity as a professional author.

== Organization ==
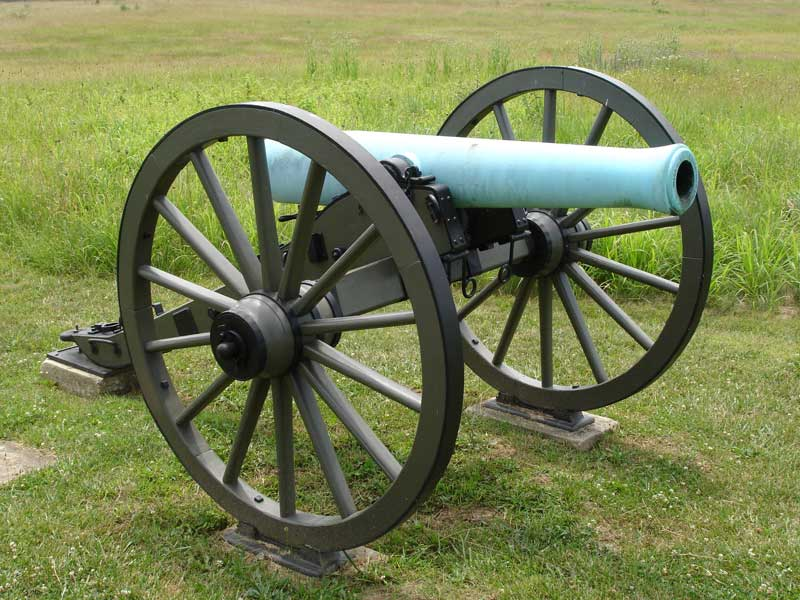
CSA M1857 Napoleon Artillery Piece

Because of the destruction of any central repository of records in the capital at Richmond in 1865 and the comparatively poor record-keeping of the time, there can be no definitive number that represents the strength of the Confederate States Army. Estimates range from 500,000 to 2,000,000 soldiers who were involved at any time during the war. Reports from the C.S. War Department beginning at the end of 1861 indicated 326,768 men that year, 449,439 in 1862, 464,646 in 1863, 400,787 in 1864, and "last reports" showed 358,692. Estimates of enlistments throughout the war range from 1,227,890 to 1,406,180.

The following calls for soldiers were issued:

- March 6, 1861: 100,000 volunteers and militia
- January 23, 1862: 400,000 volunteers and militia
- April 16, 1862, the First Conscription Act: passed by the Confederate States Congress conscripted white men ages 18 to 35 for the duration of hostilities
- September 27, 1862, the Second Conscription Act: expanded the age range to 18 to 45, with implementation beginning on July 15, 1863
- February 17, 1864, the Third Conscription Act: expanded further to ages 17 to 50
- March 13, 1865, authorized finally up to 300,000 African American slaves as troops but was never fully implemented.

The C.S.A. was initially a (strategically) defensive army, and many soldiers were resentful when General Robert E. Lee led his Army of Northern Virginia across the Potomac River in his first invasion of the North in the Antietam campaign in Maryland in September 1862.

=== Command ===
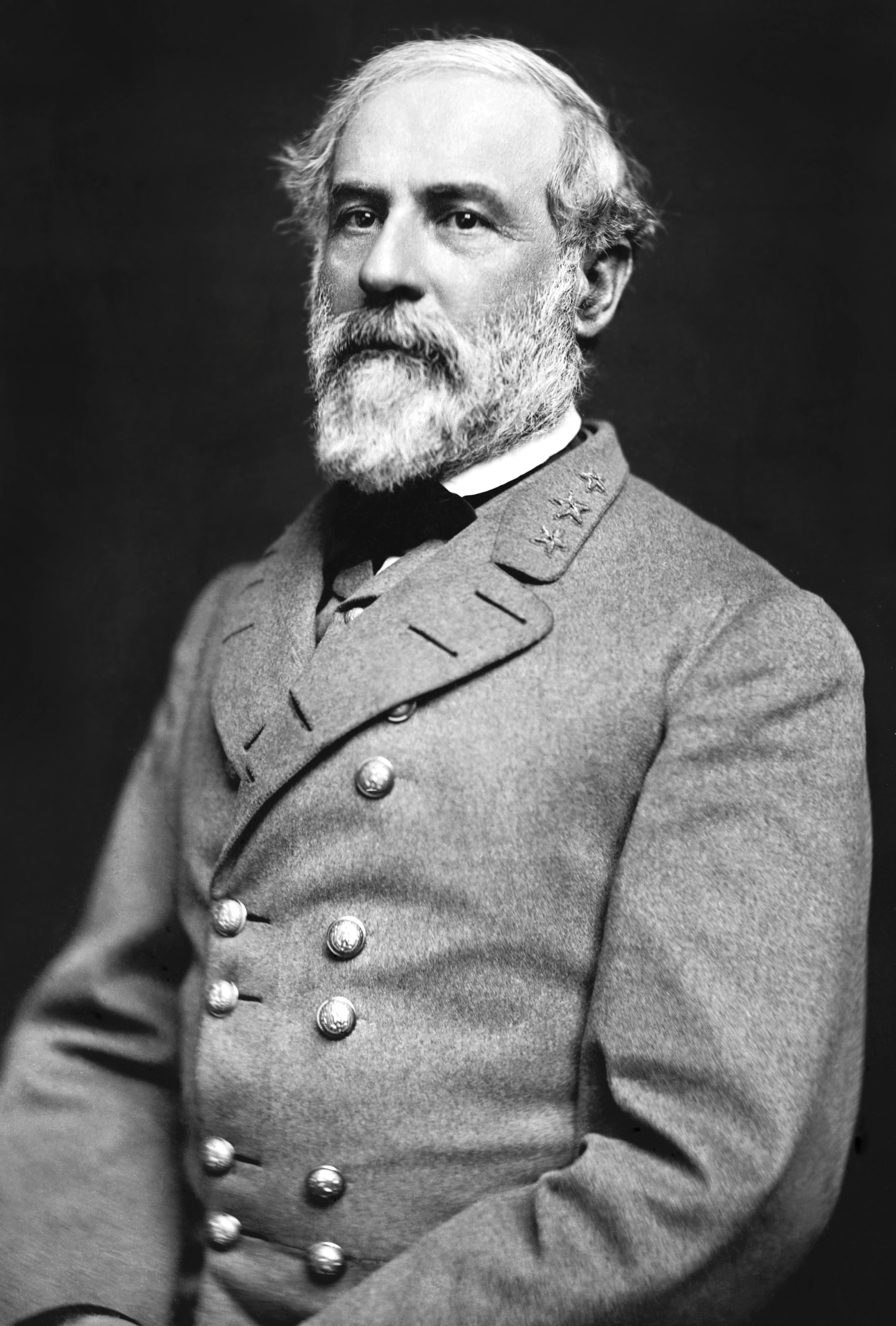
General Robert E. Lee, the Confederacy's most famous general

The Confederate States Army did not have a formal overall military commander, or general in chief, until late in the war. The Confederate President, Jefferson Davis, himself a former U.S. Army officer and U.S. Secretary of War, served as commander-in-chief and provided the overall strategic direction for Confederate land and naval forces in both eastern and western theaters. The following men had varying degrees of control:

- Robert E. Lee was "charged with the conduct of military operations in the armies of the Confederacy" from March 13 to May 31, 1862. He was referred to as President Davis' military adviser but exercised broad control over the strategic and logistical aspects of the Army, a role similar in nature to the current Chief of Staff of the United States Army (not developed until beginning in the early 20th century). On June 1, he assumed command of the Army of Northern Virginia, which was considered the most important of all the Confederate field armies.
- Braxton Bragg was similarly "charged with the conduct of military operations in the armies of the Confederacy" from February 24, 1864 (after he was relieved of field command following the Battle of Chattanooga) to January 31, 1865. This role was a military advisory position under Davis.
- Lee was formally designated General in Chief of the Armies of the Confederate States by an act of Congress (January 23, 1865) and served in this capacity from January 31 to April 9, 1865.

The lack of centralized control was a strategic weakness for the Confederacy, and there are only a few examples of its armies acting in concert across multiple theaters to achieve a common objective. One instance occurred in late 1862 with Lee's invasion of Maryland, coincident with two other actions: Bragg's invasion of Kentucky and Earl Van Dorn's advance against Corinth, Mississippi. All three initiatives were unsuccessful, however. Georgia Governor Joseph E. Brown was an extreme case of a Southern States Rights advocate asserting control over Confederate soldiers: he defied the Confederate government's wartime policies and resisted the military draft. Believing that local troops should be used only for the defense of Georgia, Brown tried to stop Colonel Francis Bartow from taking Georgia troops out of the state to the First Battle of Bull Run.

Many of the Confederacy's senior military leaders (including Robert E. Lee, Albert Sidney Johnston, and James Longstreet) and even President Jefferson Davis, were former U.S. Army and, in smaller numbers, U.S. Navy officers who had been opposed to, disapproved of, or were at least unenthusiastic about secession, but resigned their U.S. commissions upon hearing that their states had left the Union. They felt that they had no choice but to help defend their homes. President Abraham Lincoln was exasperated to hear of such men who professed to love their country but were willing to fight against it.

=== Personnel organization ===
As in the U.S. Army, the Confederate Army's soldiers were organized by military specialty. The combat arms included infantry, cavalry, and artillery.

Although fewer soldiers might comprise a squad or platoon, the smallest infantry maneuver unit in the Army was a company of 100 soldiers. Ten companies were organized into an infantry regiment, which theoretically had 1,000 men. In reality, as disease, desertions and casualties took their toll, and the common practice of sending replacements to form new regiments took hold, most regiments were greatly reduced in strength. By the mid-war, most regiments averaged 300–400 men, with Confederate units slightly smaller on average than their U.S. counterparts. For example, at the pivotal Battle of Chancellorsville, the average U.S. Army infantry regiment's strength was 433 men, versus 409 for Confederate infantry regiments.

Rough unit sizes for CSA combat units during the war:

- Corps - 24,000 to 28,000
- Division - 6,000 to 14,000
- Brigade - 800 to 1,700
- Regiment - 350 to 400
- Company – 35 to 40

Regiments, which were the basic units of army organization through which soldiers were supplied and deployed, were raised by individual states. They were generally referred by number and state, for example 1st Texas, 12th Virginia. To the extent the word "battalion" was used to describe a military unit, it referred to a multi-company task force of a regiment or a near-regimental size unit. Throughout the war, the Confederacy raised the equivalent of 1,010 regiments in all branches, including militias, versus 2,050 regiments for the U.S. Army.

Four regiments usually formed a brigade, although as the number of soldiers in many regiments became greatly reduced, especially later in the war, more than four were often assigned to a brigade. Occasionally, regiments would be transferred between brigades. Two to four brigades usually formed a division. Two to four divisions usually formed a corps. Two to four corps usually formed an army. Occasionally, a single corps might operate independently as if it were a small army. The Confederate States Army consisted of several field armies, named after their primary area of operation. The largest Confederate field army was the Army of Northern Virginia, whose surrender at Appomattox Courthouse in 1865 marked the end of major combat operations in the U.S. Civil War.

Companies were commanded by captains and had two or more lieutenants. Regiments were commanded by colonels. Lieutenant colonels were second in command. At least one major was next in command. Brigades were commanded by brigadier generals although casualties or other attrition sometimes meant that brigades would be commanded by senior colonels or even a lower grade officer. Barring the same type of circumstances that might leave a lower grade officer in temporary command, divisions were commanded by major generals and corps were commanded by lieutenant generals. A few corps commanders were never confirmed as lieutenant generals and exercised corps command for varying periods as major generals. Armies of more than one corps were commanded by (full) generals.

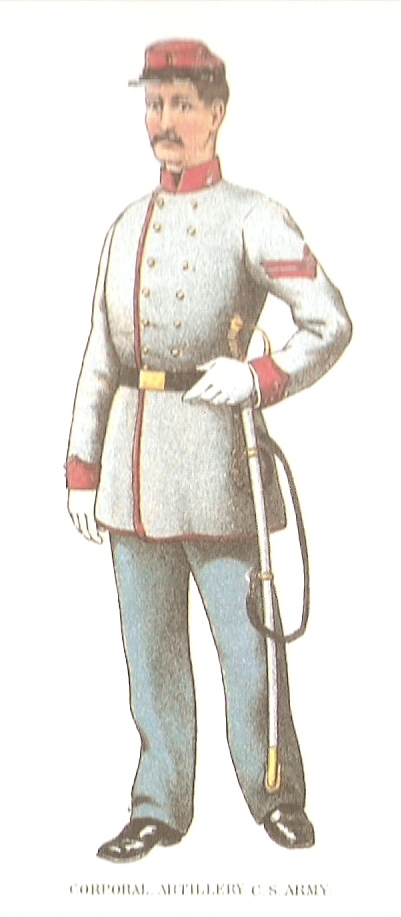
Corporal of the Artillery division of the Confederate Army

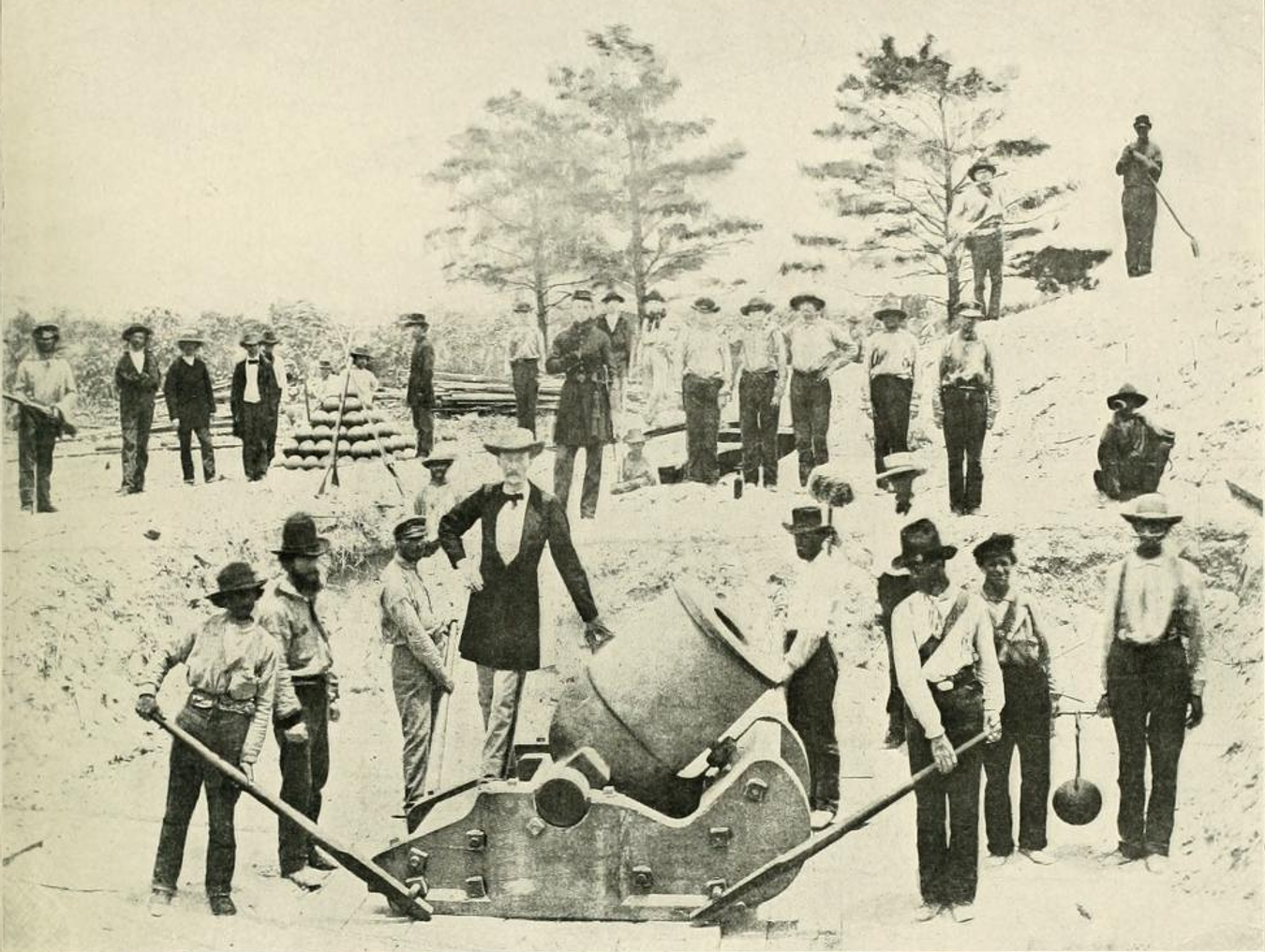
Confederate mortar crew at Warrington, Florida in 1861, across from Fort Pickens

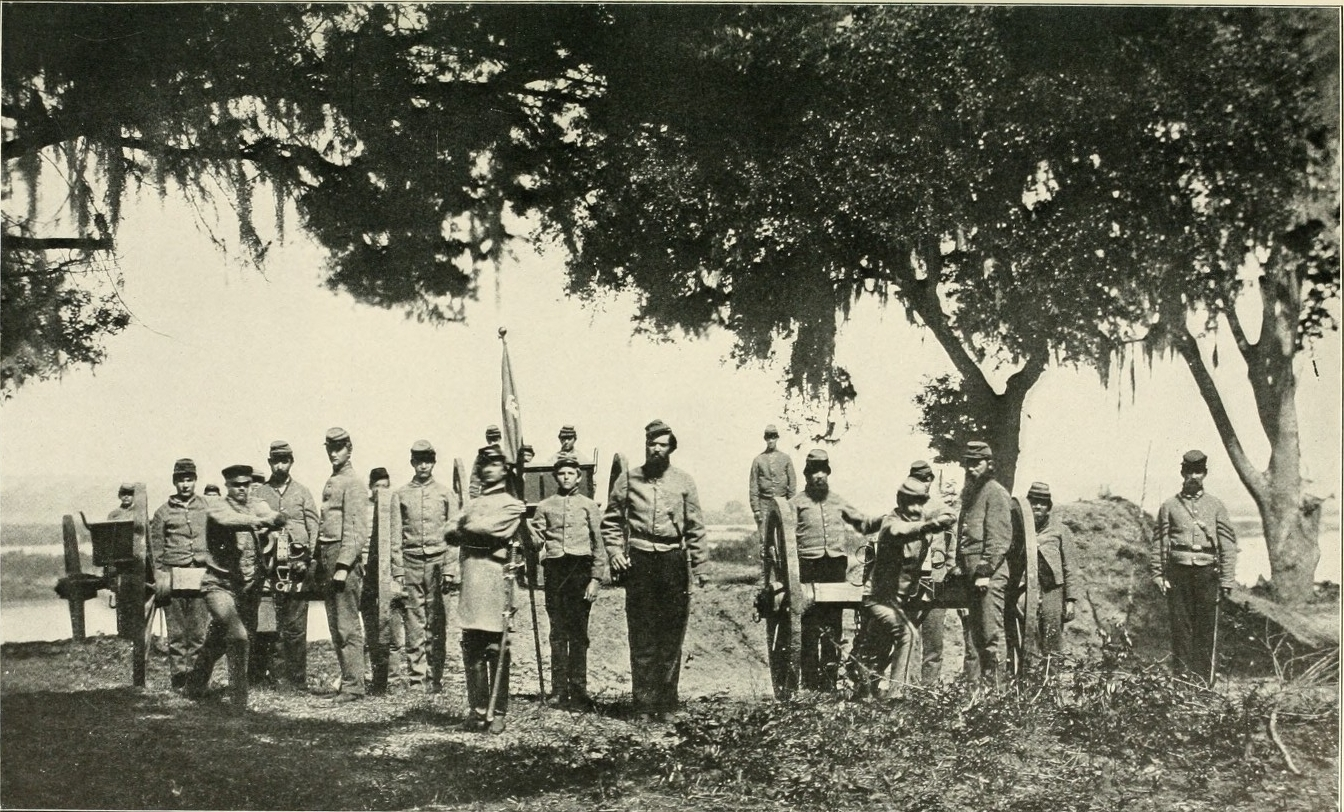
Confederate artillery at Charleston Harbor, 1863

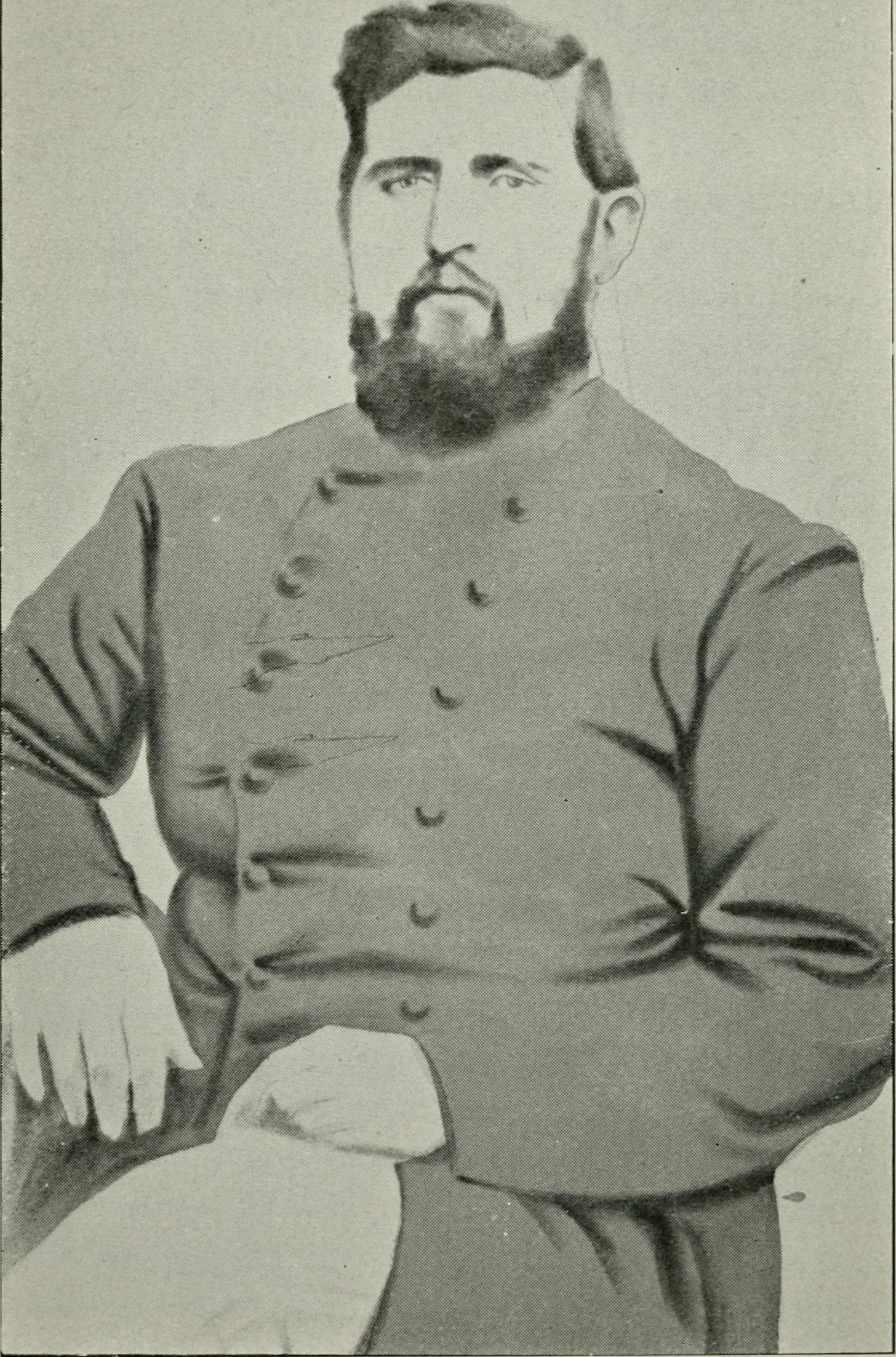
Lt Col. E. V. Nash, 4th Georgia Infantry Doles-Cook Brigade, who was killed in 1864

=== Ranks and insignia ===
Officer rank structure of the Confederate Army

General

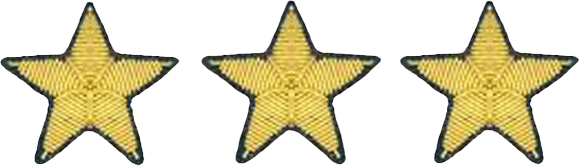
Colonel

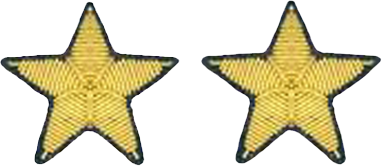
Lieutenant colonel

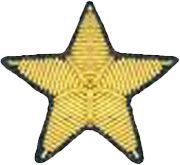
Major

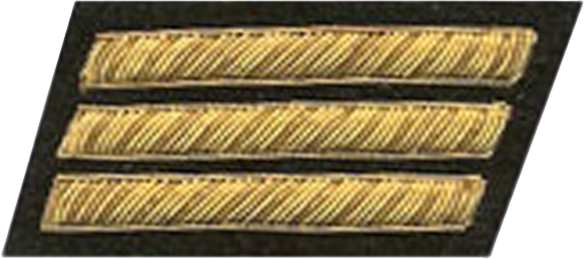
Captain

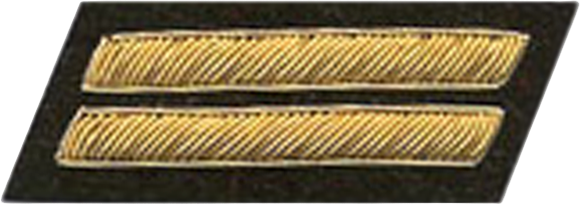
First lieutenant

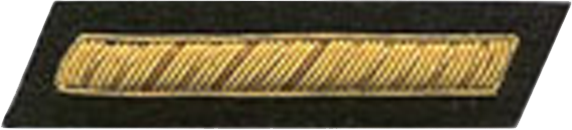
Second lieutenant

General (CSA)

Colonel (Infantry shown)

Lieutenant-colonel (Headquarters shown)

Major (Medical Corps shown)

Captain (Marine Corps shown)

1st Lieutenant (Artillery shown)

2nd Lieutenant (Cavalry shown)

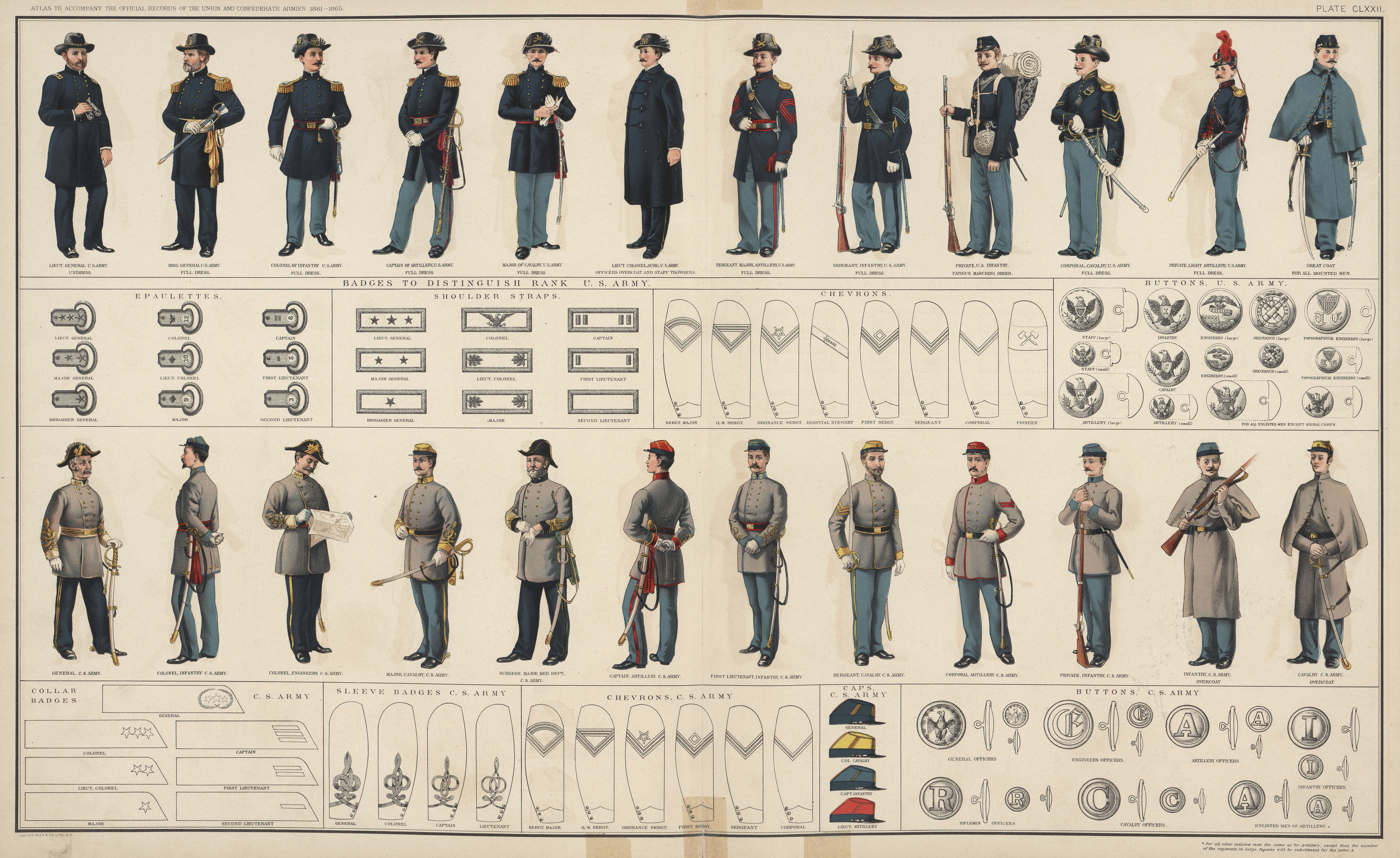
An 1895 illustration showing the uniforms of the Confederate Army contrasted with those of the U.S. Army

There were four grades of general officer (general, lieutenant general, major general, and brigadier general), but all wore the same insignia regardless of grade. This was a decision made early in the conflict. The Confederate Congress initially made the rank of brigadier general the highest rank. As the war progressed, the other general-officer ranks were quickly added, but no insignia for them was created. (Robert E. Lee was a notable exception to this. He chose to wear the rank insignia of a colonel.) Only seven men achieved the rank of (full) general; the highest-ranking (earliest date of rank) was Samuel Cooper, Adjutant General and Inspector General of the Confederate States Army.

Officers' uniforms bore a braided design on the sleeves and kepi, the number of adjacent strips (and therefore the width of the lines of the design) denoting rank. The color of the piping and kepi denoted the military branch. The braid was sometimes left off by officers since it made them conspicuous targets. The kepi was rarely used, the common slouch hat being preferred for its practicality in the Southern climate.

Enlisted rank structure
Sergeant Major	Quartermaster Sergeant	Ordnance Sergeant	First Sergeant
Sergeant	Corporal	Musician	Private
		no insignia	no insignia

Branch colors were used for the color of chevrons—blue for infantry, yellow for cavalry, and red for artillery. This could differ with some units, however, depending on available resources or the unit commander's desire. Cavalry regiments from Texas, for example, often used red insignia and at least one Texas infantry regiment used black.

The CSA differed from many contemporaneous armies in that all officers under the rank of brigadier general were elected by the soldiers under their command. The Confederate Congress authorized the awarding of medals for courage and good conduct on October 13, 1862, but wartime difficulties prevented the procurement of the needed medals. To avoid postponing recognition for their valor, those nominated for the awards had their names placed on a Roll of Honor, which would be read at the first dress parade after its receipt and be published in at least one newspaper in each state.

=== Armies and prominent leaders ===
The C.S. Army was composed of independent armies and military departments that were constituted, renamed, and disbanded as needs arose, particularly in reaction to offensives launched by the United States. These major units were generally named after states or geographic regions (in comparison to the U.S. Army's custom of naming armies after rivers). Armies were usually commanded by full generals (there were seven in the C.S. Army) or lieutenant generals. Some of the more important armies and their commanders were:

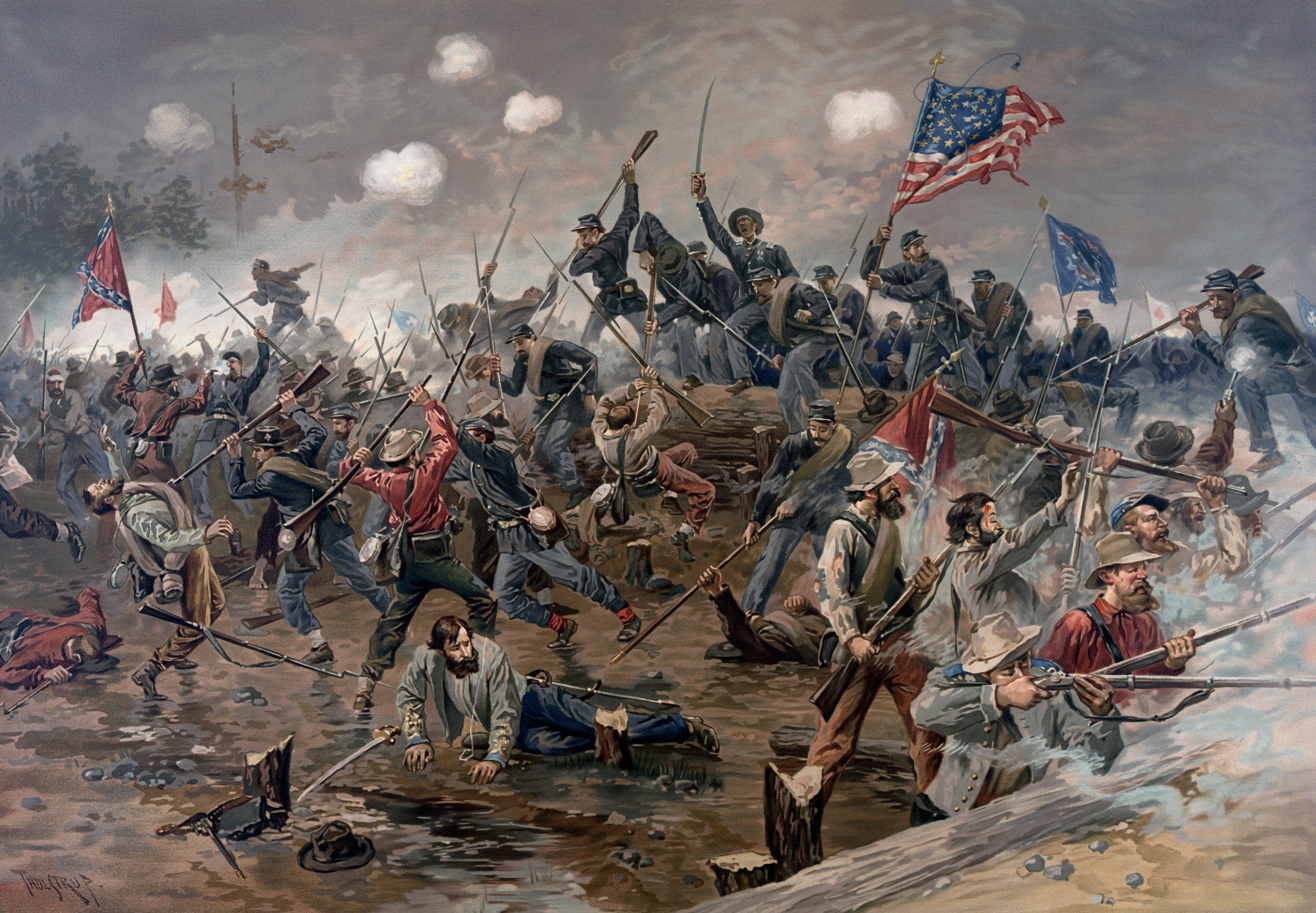
A painting of Lee's Army of Northern Virginia fighting the U.S. Army at Spotsylvania in 1864

- Army of Central Kentucky – Simon B. Buckner, Albert Sidney Johnston
- Army of East Tennessee – Edmund Kirby Smith (later renamed Army of Kentucky)
- Army of Eastern Kentucky – Humphrey Marshall
- Army of the Kanawha – Henry A. Wise, John B. Floyd, Robert E. Lee
- Army of Kentucky – Edmund Kirby Smith (eventually commander of all forces West of the Mississippi)
- Army of Louisiana – Braxton Bragg. Paul O. Hébert
- Army of Mississippi
  - March 1862 – November 1862: P. G. T. Beauregard, Albert Sidney Johnston, Braxton Bragg, William J. Hardee, Leonidas Polk, (also known as the Army of the Mississippi; redesignated Army of Tennessee on November 20, 1862)
  - December 1862 – July 1863: John C. Pemberton, Earl Van Dorn, (1863) William W. Loring (also known as Army of Vicksburg)
  - July 1863 – June 1864: William J. Hardee, Leonidas Polk, William W. Loring (also known as the Army of the Mississippi; redesignated III Corps, Army of Tennessee in May 1864, but continued to use its old name)
- Army of Middle Tennessee – John C. Breckinridge
- Army of Missouri – Sterling Price
- Army of Mobile – Jones M. Withers, Braxton Bragg, John B. Villepigue, Samuel Jones, William L. Powell, John H. Forney
- Army of New Mexico – Henry H. Sibley
- Army of Northern Virginia – Joseph E. Johnston, Gustavus W. Smith, Robert E. Lee
  - First Corps, Army of Northern Virginia
  - Second Corps, Army of Northern Virginia
  - Third Corps, Army of Northern Virginia
  - Fourth Corps, Army of Northern Virginia, often styled "Anderson's Corps"
  - Cavalry Corps, Army of Northern Virginia
- Army of the New River – Henry Heth
- Army of the Northwest – Robert S. Garnett, Henry R. Jackson, William W. Loring, Edward Johnson
- Army of the Peninsula – John B. Magruder, Daniel H. Hill
- Army of Pensacola – Adley H. Gladden, Braxton Bragg, Samuel Jones
- Army of the Potomac – P. G. T. Beauregard, Joseph E. Johnston
- Army of the Shenandoah – Joseph E. Johnston
- Army of Tennessee – Braxton Bragg, Samuel Gibbs French, William J. Hardee, Daniel H. Hill, John Bell Hood, Joseph E. Johnston, Richard Taylor
  - First Corps, Army of Tennessee
  - Second Corps, Army of Tennessee
  - Third Corps, Army of Tennessee
  - Forrest's Cavalry Corps – Nathan Bedford Forrest
- Army of the Trans-Mississippi – Thomas C. Hindman, Theophilus Holmes, Edmund Kirby Smith (also known as the Army of the Southwest)
- Army of the Valley (also known as Second Corps, Army of Northern Virginia) – Jubal Early
- Army of the West – Earl van Dorn, John P. McCown, Dabney H. Maury, Sterling Price
- Army of West Tennessee – Earl Van Dorn
- Army of Western Louisiana – Richard Taylor, John G. Walker

Some other prominent Confederate generals who led significant units operating sometimes independently in the CSA included Thomas J. "Stonewall" Jackson, James Longstreet, J. E. B. Stuart, Gideon Pillow, A. P. Hill, John B. Gordon.

=== Military departments ===
In addition to the Confederate field armies, the Confederate States itself was divided into several military territorial organizations, known as departments. These departments were mainly administrative in nature, organizing recruiting, supply distribution, and coordinating with the field armies in the event of Union invasions. The military departments were also the ultimate authority for all Confederate forts within their region, as well as commanding all garrison forces and units of the Confederate Home Guard.

Unlike the Union, which had fairly stable military departments through most of the Civil War, Confederate departments were constantly being formed, reformed, and renamed as the war progressed. The original two departments, formed at the beginning of the Civil War, were "Department No 1" (later incorporated into the Department of Louisiana) and "Department No 2" (later becoming the Western Department).

In Virginia, where hostilities broke out almost immediately after the start of the war, the "Alexandria line" was established as the first Confederate administrative body in this area. This was later expanded to formal military departments in the following order:

- Department of Alexandria
- Department of the Potomac
- Department of Northern Virginia

Virginia also maintained the following smaller departments which fluctuated as the war progressed:

- Department of Norfolk
- Department of Fredericksburg
- Department of Richmond (operated in tandem with the Department of Henrico)
- Department of Southwestern Virginia
- Department of the Peninsula

In the Shenandoah Valley, the first Confederate administrative command was set up at Harper's Ferry, later becoming the Valley District, directly subordinate to the Army of the Shenandoah. The Shenandoah Valley was without a department for most of the war, militarily controlled by Army of the Northwest and the Army of the Valley, before finally being declared the Trans-Allegheny Department. Elsewhere in the Confederacy, the following major departments were formed which operated throughout most of the war:

- Department of Louisiana
- Department of Tennessee
- Department of North Carolina
- Department of South Carolina
- Department of Georgia

The Union attack on Vicksburg, Mississippi also brought about a succession of departments known as:

- Department of Mississippi and East Louisiana
- Department of Alabama and East Mississippi
- Department of Alabama, Mississippi, and Eastern Louisiana

The entire Mississippi region was eventually merged into the Trans-Mississippi Department, one of the largest departments of the war. At the same time, departments were being formed further west as the:

- Western Department
- Department of Texas
- Department of the Indian Territory

Battles in Tennessee, and shifting fronts in that region, also brought about the need for new departments in that region, most of which reported directly to the Army of Tennessee under John Bell Hood. Hood would directly command the following three departments at the same time as his service as an Army commander:

- Department of East Tennessee
- Department of East Tennessee and West Virginia
- Department of Tennessee and Georgia

In 1864, Robert E. Lee held the idea for "super theaters" encompassing vast areas of the south, as follows:

- Department of North Carolina and Southern Virginia - an expansion of the Department of Southern Virginia
- Department of South Carolina, Georgia, and East Florida
- Department of South Carolina and Georgia - later expanded to the Department of South Carolina, Georgia, and Florida

Lesser departments, without much combat activity, were:

- Department of West Florida
- Department of Alabama and West Florida (expansion of the District of Alabama)
- Department of Middle and Eastern Florida
- Department of Western Kentucky

== Supply and logistics ==
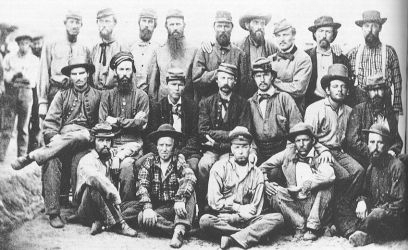
A group of Confederate soldiers-possibly an artillery unit captured at Island No. 10 and taken at POW Camp Douglas (Chicago); photograph possibly by D. F. Brandon

The supply situation for most Confederate armies was dismal, even when they were victorious on the battlefield. The central Confederate government was short of money so each state government had to supply its regiments. The lack of central authority and the ineffective railroads, combined with the frequent unwillingness or inability of Southern state governments to provide adequate funding, were key factors in the Confederate army's demise. The Confederacy early on lost control of most of its major river and ocean ports to capture or blockade. The road system was poor, and it relied more and more on a heavily overburdened railroad system. U.S. forces destroyed track, engines, cars, bridges and telegraph lines as often as possible, knowing that new equipment was unavailable to the Confederacy. Occasional raids into the North were designed to bring back money and supplies. In 1864, the Confederates burned down Chambersburg, a Pennsylvania city they had raided twice in the years before, due to its failure to pay an extortion demand.

As a result of severe supply problems, as well as the lack of textile factories in the Confederacy and the successful U.S. naval blockade of Southern ports, the typical Confederate soldier was rarely able to wear the standard regulation uniform, particularly as the war progressed. While on the march or in parade formation, Confederate armies often displayed a wide array of dress, ranging from faded, patched-together regulation uniforms; rough, homespun uniforms colored with homemade dyes such as butternut (a yellow-brown color), and even soldiers in a hodgepodge of civilian clothing. After a successful battle, it was not unusual for victorious Confederate troops to procure U.S. Army uniform parts from captured supplies and dead U.S. soldiers; this would occasionally cause confusion in later battles and skirmishes.

Individual states were expected to supply their soldiers, which led to a lack of uniformity. Some states (such as North Carolina) were able to better supply their soldiers, while other states (such as Texas) were unable for various reasons to adequately supply their troops as the war continued.

Furthermore, each state often had its uniform regulations and insignia, which meant that the "standard" Confederate uniform often featured a variety of differences based on the state the soldier came from. For example, uniforms for North Carolina regiments often featured a colored strip of cloth on their shoulders to designate what part of the service the soldier was in. Confederate soldiers also frequently suffered from inadequate supplies of shoes, tents, and other gear, and would be forced to innovate and make do with whatever they could scrounge from the local countryside. While Confederate officers were generally better-supplied and were normally able to wear a regulation officer's uniform, they often chose to share other hardships – such as the lack of adequate food – with their troops.

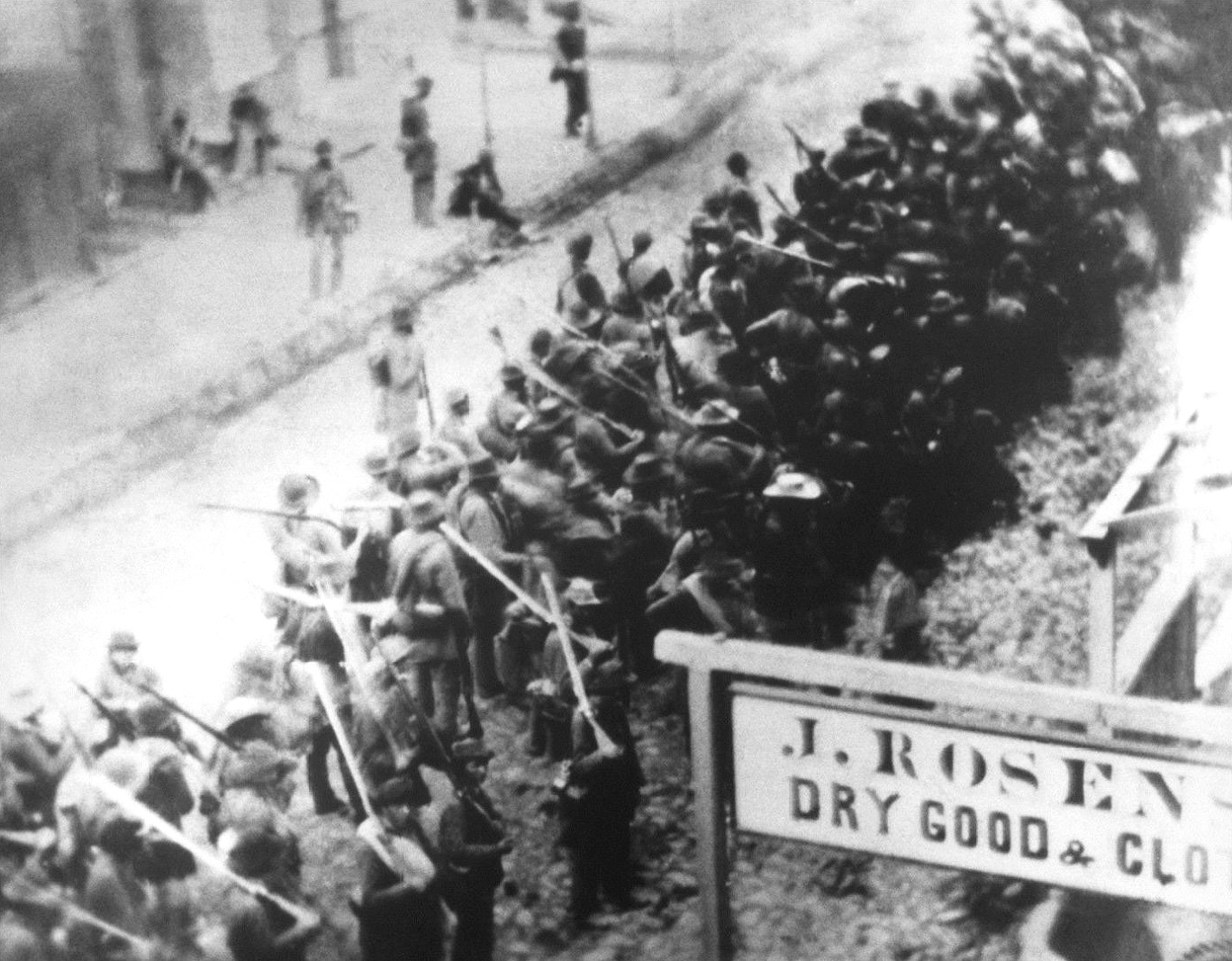
Confederate troops marching south on N Market Street, Frederick, Maryland, during the Civil War

Confederate soldiers were also faced with inadequate food rations, especially as the war progressed. There was plenty of meat in the Confederacy. The unsolvable problem was shipping it to the armies, especially when Lee's army in Virginia was at the end of a long, tenuous supply line. The United States victory at Vicksburg in 1863 shut off supplies from Texas and the west.

By 1863, Confederate generals such as Robert E. Lee often spent as much time and effort searching for food for their men, as they did in planning strategy and tactics. Individual commanders often had to "beg, borrow or steal" food and ammunition from whatever sources were available, including captured U.S. depots and encampments, and private citizens regardless of their loyalties. Lee's campaign against Gettysburg and southern Pennsylvania (a rich agricultural region) was driven in part by his desperate need of supplies, especially food.

General Sherman's total warfare reduced the ability of the South to produce food and ship it to the armies or its cities. Coupled with the U.S. blockade of all ports the devastation of plantations, farms and railroads meant the Confederacy increasingly lost the capacity to feed its soldiers and civilians.

=== Arms importation ===
The Confederate government had some success in importing weapons from Britain. When the War began, the Confederacy lacked the financial and manufacturing capacity to wage war against the industrialized North. To increase its arsenal, the Confederacy looked to Britain as a major source of arms. British merchants and bankers funded the purchase of arms and construction of ships being outfitted as blockade runners which later carried war supplies bound for Southern ports. A British publication in 1862 summed up the country's involvement in blockade running:

Score after score of the finest, swiftest British steamers and ships, loaded with British material of war of every description, cannon, rifles by the hundreds of thousand, powder by the thousand of tons, shot, shell, cartridges, swords, etc, with cargo after cargo of clothes, boots, shoes, blankets, medicines and supplies of every kind, all paid for by British money, at the sole risk of British adventurers, well insured by Lloyds and under the protection of the British flag, have been sent across the ocean to the insurgents by British agency.

It was estimated the Confederate Army received thousands of tons of gunpowder, half a million rifles, and several hundred cannons from British blockade runners.

Ulysses S. Grant III, President of the American Civil War Centennial in 1961, remarked for example:

[B]etween October 26, 1864 and January 1865, it was still possible for 8,632,000 lbs of meat, 1,507,000 lbs of lead, 1,933,000 lbs of saltpeter, 546,000 pairs of shoes, 316,000 blankets, half a million pounds of coffee, 69,000 rifles, and 43 cannon to run the blockade into the port of Wilmington alone, while cotton sufficient to pay for these purchases was exported[. I]t is evident that the blockade runners made an important contribution to the Confederate effort to carry on.

== Italian Americans and the Confederate Army ==
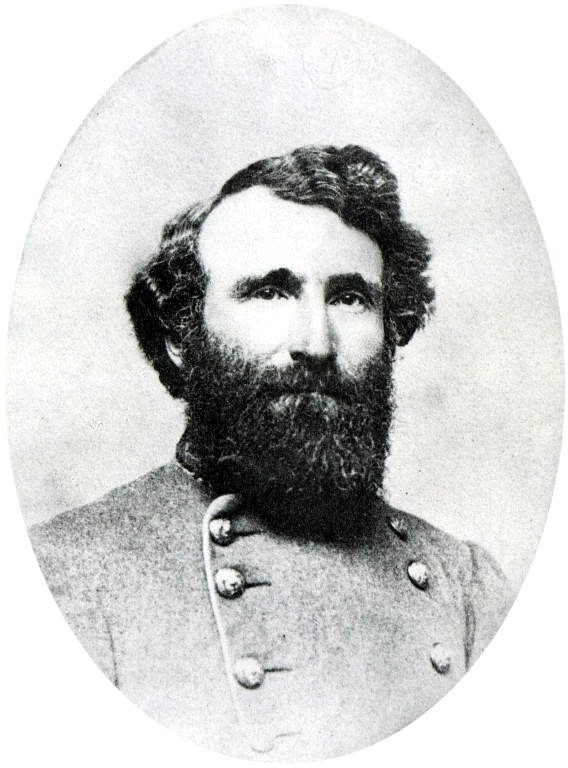
William B. Taliaferro was Confederate general in the American Civil War.

Many Italian American soldiers of the Confederate States Army were veterans from the Army of the Two Sicilies who had fought against Giuseppe Garibaldi in, and were captured during, the Expedition of the Thousand as part of the unification of Italy. They were released after a treaty between Garibaldi and Chatham Roberdeau Wheat. In December 1860 and few months of 1861, these volunteers were transported to New Orleans with the ships Elisabetta, Olyphant, Utile, Charles & Jane, Washington and Franklin. Most Confederate Italian Americans had settled in Louisiana. The militia of Louisiana had an Italian Guards Battalion that became part of its 6th Regiment.

== Native Americans and the Confederate Army ==
Native Americans served in both the United States and Confederate military during the American Civil War. They fought knowing they might jeopardize their freedom, unique cultures, and ancestral lands if they ended up on the losing side of the Civil War. During the Civil War, 28,693 Native Americans served in the U.S. and Confederate armies, participating in battles such as Pea Ridge, Second Manassas, Antietam, Spotsylvania, Cold Harbor, and in Federal assaults on Petersburg. Many Native American tribes, such as the Creek, the Cherokee, and the Choctaw, were slaveholders themselves, and thus, found a political and economic commonality with the Confederacy.

At the beginning of the war, Albert Pike was appointed as Confederate envoy to Native Americans. In this capacity he negotiated several treaties, one such treaty was the Treaty with Choctaws and Chickasaws conducted in July 1861. The treaty covered sixty-four terms covering many subjects like Choctaw and Chickasaw nation sovereignty, Confederate States of America citizenship possibilities, and an entitled delegate in the House of Representatives of the Confederate States of America. The Cherokee, Choctaw, Seminole, Catawba, and Creek tribes were the only tribes to fight on the Confederate side. The Confederacy wanted to recruit Indians east of the Mississippi River in 1862, so they opened up a recruiting camp in Mobile, Alabama "at the foot of Stone Street". The Mobile Advertiser and Register would advertise for a chance at military service.

A Chance for Active Service. The Secretary of War has authorized me to enlist all the Indians east of the Mississippi River into the service of the Confederate States, as Scouts. In addition to the Indians, I will receive all white male citizens, who are good marksmen. To each member, Fifty Dollars Bounty, clothes, arms, camp equipage &c: furnished. The weapons shall be Enfield Rifles. For further information address me at Mobile, Ala. (Signed) S. G. Spann, Comm'ing Choctaw Forces.

— Jacqueline Anderson Matte, They Say the Wind Is Red

=== Cherokee ===
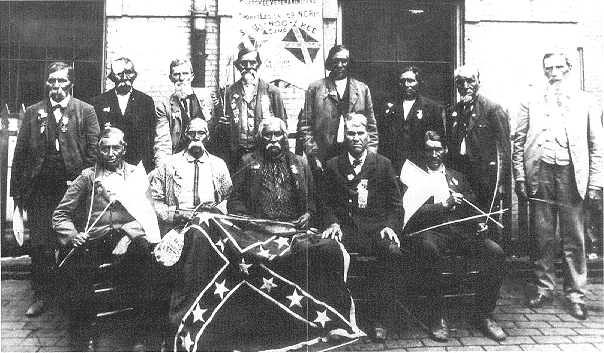
A Cherokee Confederates reunion in New Orleans, 1903

Stand Watie, along with a few Cherokee, sided with the Confederate army, in which he was made colonel and commanded a battalion of Cherokee. Reluctantly, on October 7, 1861, Chief Ross signed a treaty transferring all obligations due to the Cherokee from the United States to the Confederate States. The Cherokee were guaranteed protection, rations of food, livestock, tools, and other goods, as well as a delegate to the Confederate Congress at Richmond.

In exchange, the Cherokee would furnish ten companies of mounted men, and allow the construction of military posts and roads within the Cherokee Nation. However, no Indian regiment was to be called on to fight outside Indian Territory. As a result of the Treaty, the 2nd Cherokee Mounted Rifles, led by Col. John Drew, was formed. Following the Battle of Pea Ridge, Arkansas, March 7–8, 1862, Drew's Mounted Rifles defected to the United States forces in Kansas, where they joined the Indian Home Guard. In the summer of 1862, U.S. troops captured Chief Ross, who was paroled and spent the remainder of the war in Washington and Philadelphia proclaiming Cherokee loyalty to the United States Army.

William Holland Thomas, the adopted white son of the chief of the Eastern Band of Cherokee Indians, recruited hundreds of Cherokees for the Confederate army, particularly for Thomas' Legion. The Legion, raised in September 1862, fought until the end of the War.

=== Choctaw ===
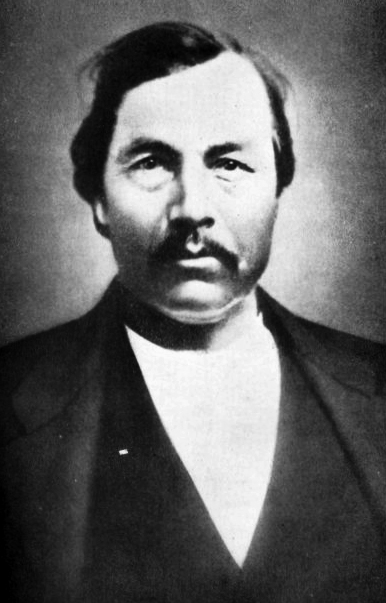
Jackson McCurtain, Lieutenant Colonel of the First Choctaw Battalion in Oklahoma, CSA

Choctaw Confederate battalions were formed in Indian Territory and later in Mississippi in support of the southern cause. The Choctaws, who were expecting support from the Confederates, got little. Webb Garrison, a Civil War historian, describes their response: when Confederate Brigadier General Albert Pike authorized the raising of regiments during the fall of 1860, Seminoles, Creeks, Chickasaws, Choctaws, and Cherokees responded with considerable enthusiasm. Their zeal for the Confederate cause, however, began to evaporate when they found that neither arms nor pay had been arranged for them. A disgusted officer later acknowledged that "with the exception of a partial supply for the Choctaw regiment, no tents, clothing, or camp, and garrison equipage was furnished to any of them."

== African Americans and the Confederate Army ==
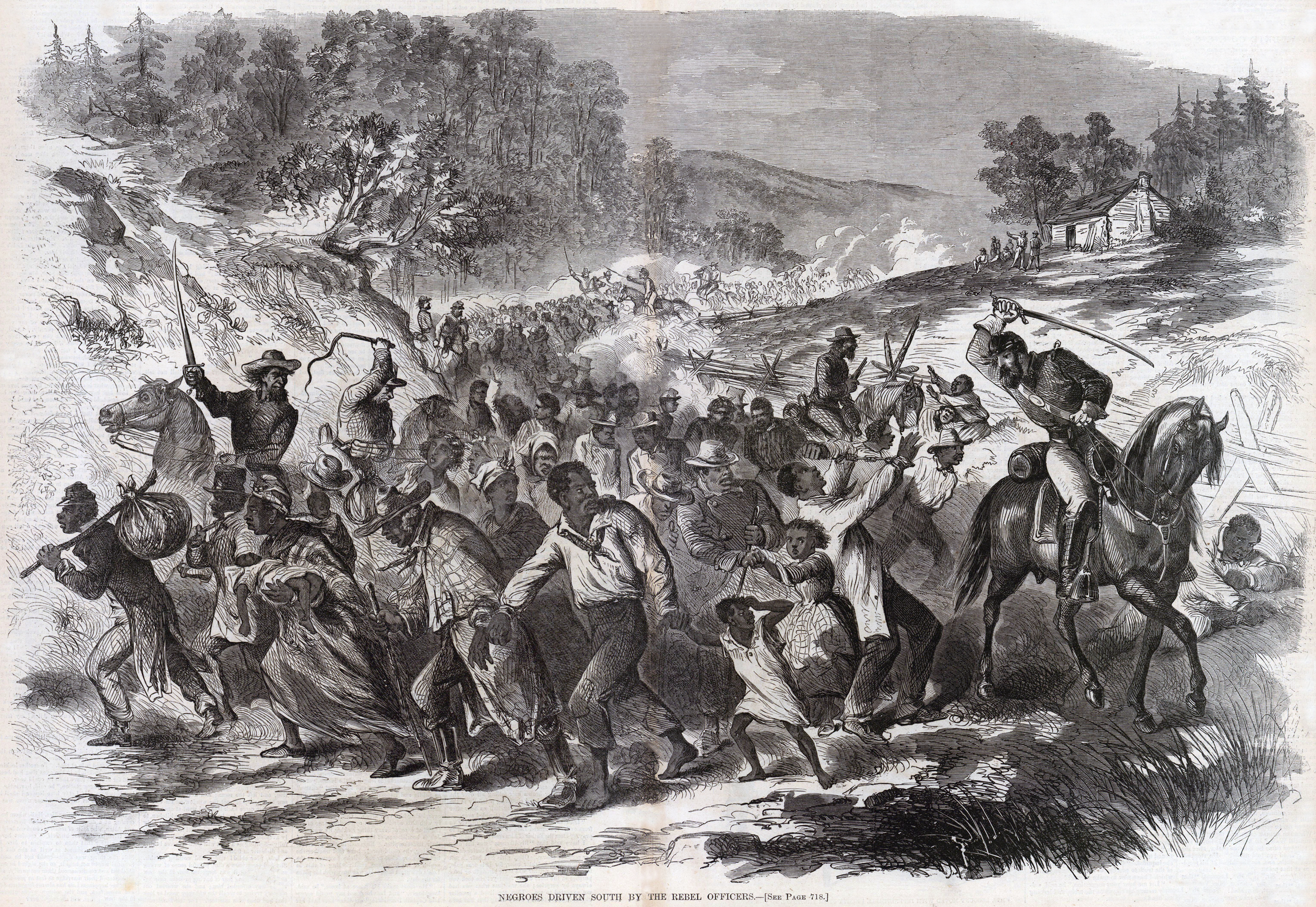
1862 illustration showing Confederates escorting kidnapped African American civilians south into slavery. A similar instance occurred in Pennsylvania when the Army of Northern Virginia invaded it in 1863 to fight the U.S. at Gettysburg.

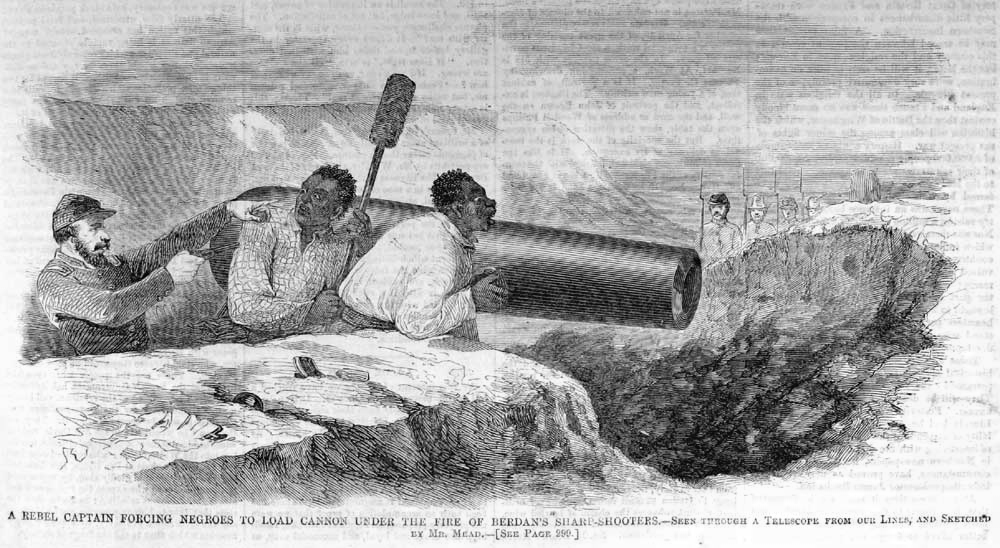
An 1862 illustration of a Confederate officer forcing slaves at gunpoint to fire a cannon at U.S. soldiers in battle. A similar instance occurred at the First Battle of Bull Run, where slaves were forced by the Confederates to load and fire a cannon at U.S. forces.

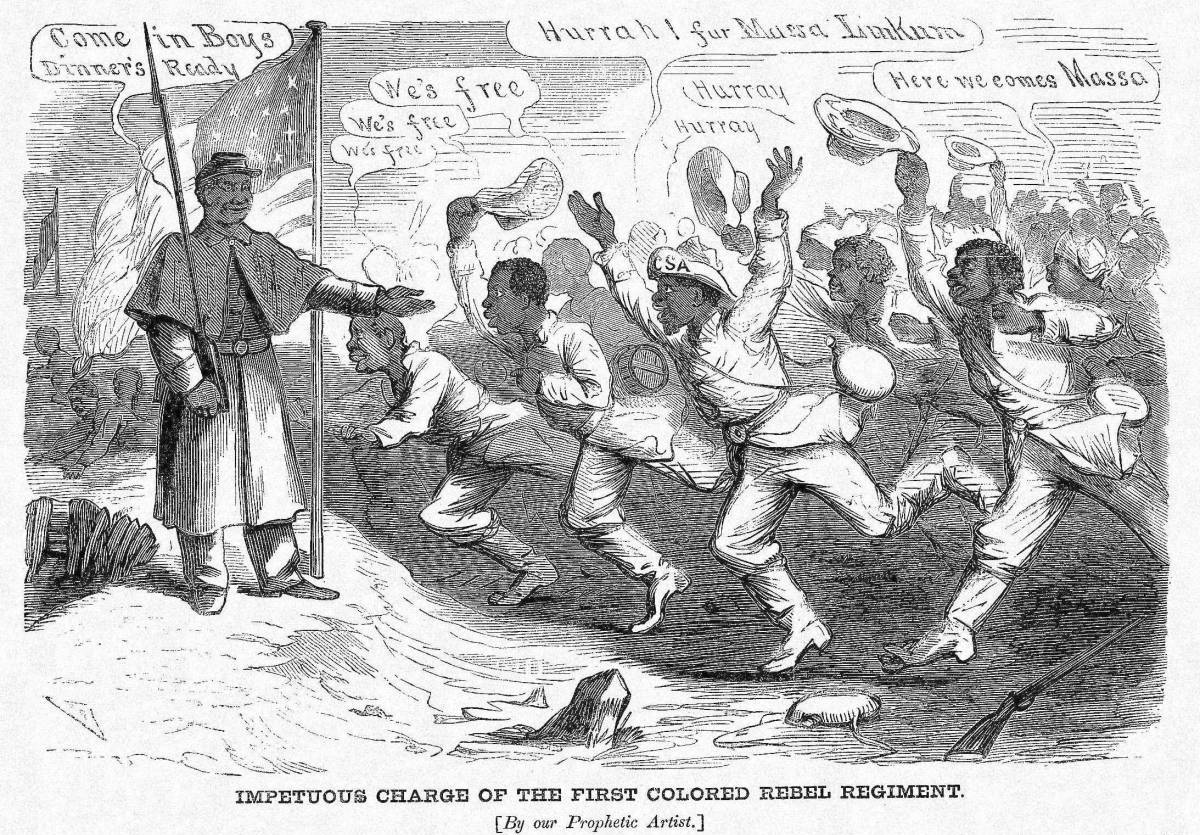
An 1864 cartoon lampooning the Confederacy's deliberating on the use of black soldiers, showing them defecting en masse towards U.S. lines if such proposals were adopted

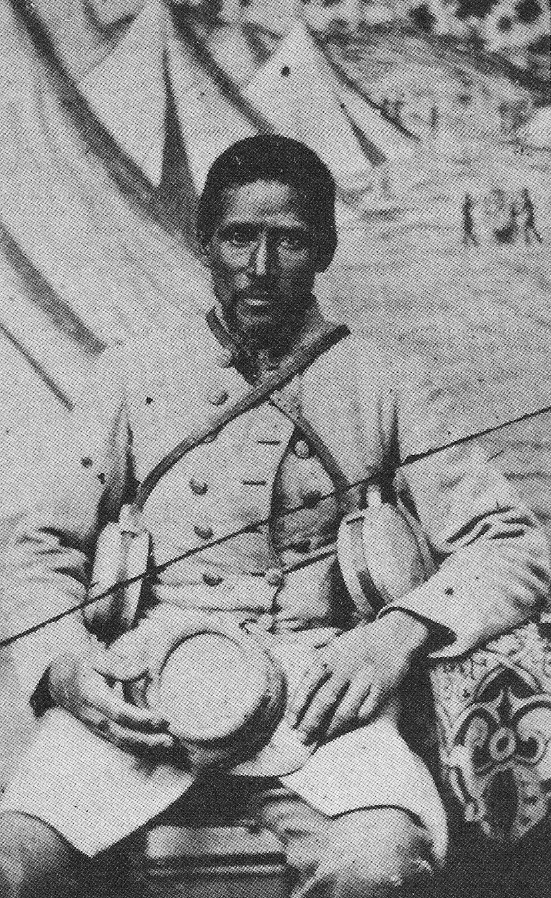
"Marlboro", an African American body servant to a white Confederate soldier

With so many white males conscripted into the army and roughly 40% of its population unfree, the work required to maintain a functioning society in the Confederacy ended up largely on the backs of slaves. Even Georgia governor Joseph E. Brown noted that "the country and the army are mainly dependent upon slave labor for support." African American slave labor was used in a wide variety of logistical support roles for the Confederacy, from infrastructure and mining, to teamster and medical roles such as hospital attendants and nurses.

=== Using enslaved soldiers ===
The Confederacy did not allow African Americans to join the army, neither free people nor slaves. The idea of arming the Confederacy's slaves for use as soldiers was speculated on from the onset of the war, but such proposals were not seriously considered by Jefferson Davis or others in the Confederate administration until late in the war when severe manpower shortages were faced. Gary Gallagher writes, "When Lee publicly advocated arming slaves in early 1865, he did so as a desperate expedient that might prolong Southern military resistance." After acrimonious debate the Confederate Congress agreed in March 1865. The war was nearly over by then, and only about two hundred enslaved soldiers ended up being enlisted before the Confederate armies all surrendered.

==== Opposition from Confederates ====
As early as November 1864, some Confederates knew that the chance of securing victory against the U.S. was slim. Despite lacking foreign assistance and recognition and facing slim chances of victory against superior U.S. resources, Confederate newspapers such as the Georgia Atlanta Southern Confederacy continued to maintain their position and oppose the idea of armed black men in the Confederate Army, even as late in the war as January 1865. They stated that it was incongruous with the Confederacy's goals and views regarding African Americans and slavery. The Georgia newspaper opined that using black men as soldiers would be an embarrassment to Confederates and their children, saying that although African Americans should be used for slave labor, they should not be used as armed soldiers, opining that:

Such an act on our part would be a stigma on the imperishable pages of history, of which all future generations of Southrons would be ashamed. These are some of the additional considerations which have suggested themselves to us. Let us put the negro to work, but not to fight.

— Atlanta Southern Confederacy (January 20, 1865), Macon, Georgia.

Prominent Confederates such as R. M. T. Hunter and Georgia Democrat Howell Cobb opposed arming slaves, saying that it was "suicidal" and would run contrary to the Confederacy's ideology. Opposing such a move, Cobb stated that African Americans were untrustworthy and innately lacked the qualities to make good soldiers, and that using them would cause many Confederates to quit the army. Cobb said that using blacks as soldiers would be the end of the revolution, because "if slaves make good soldiers, our whole theory of slavery is wrong."

The overwhelming support most Confederates had for maintaining black slavery was the primary cause of their strong opposition to using African Americans as armed soldiers. Former Confederate secretary of state Robert Toombs said "In my opinion, the worst calamity that could befall us would be to gain our independence by the valor of our slaves... instead of our own... " and complained using black troops would be "a surrender of the entire slavery question." Maintaining the institution of slavery was the primary goal of the Confederacy's existence, and thus, using their slaves as soldiers was incongruous with that goal. According to historian Paul D. Escott:

[F]or a great many of the most powerful southerners the idea of arming and freeing the slaves was repugnant because the protection of slavery had been and still remained the central core of Confederate purpose ... Slavery was the basis of the planter class's wealth, power, and position in society. The South's leading men of the planter class, had built their world upon slavery and the idea of voluntarily destroying that world, even in the ultimate crisis, was almost unthinkable to them. Such feelings moved Senator R. M. T. Hunter to deliver a long speech against the bill to arm the slaves.

Though most Confederates were opposed to the idea of using black soldiers, a small number suggested the idea. An acrimonious and controversial debate was raised by a letter from Patrick Cleburne urging the Confederacy to raise black soldiers by offering emancipation; Jefferson Davis refused to consider the proposal and issued instructions forbidding the matter from being discussed. It would not be until Robert E. Lee wrote the Confederate Congress urging them that the idea would take serious traction.

On March 13, 1865, the Confederate Congress passed General Order 14 by a single vote in the Confederate senate, and Jefferson Davis signed the order into law. The order was issued March 23, but as it was late in the war, only a few African American companies were raised in the Richmond area before the town was captured by the U.S. Army and placed back under U.S. control. According to historian James M. McPherson in 1994, "no black soldiers fought in the Confederate army, unless they were passing as white. He noted that some Confederates brought along "their body servants, who in many cases had grown up with them" and that "on occasion some of those body servants were known to have picked up a rifle and fought. But there was no official recruitment of black soldiers in the Confederate army until the very end of the war...." He continued, "But Appomattox came only a few weeks later, and none of these men were ever put in uniform to fight."

=== Treatment of black civilians ===
In some cases, the Confederates forced their African American slaves to fire upon U.S. soldiers at gunpoint, such as at the First Battle of Bull Run. According to John Parker, a slave who was forced by the Confederates to fight Union soldiers, "Our masters tried all they could to make us fight ... They promised to give us our freedom and money besides, but none of us believed them; we only fought because we had to." Parker stated that had he been given an opportunity, he would have turned against his Confederate captors, and "could do it with pleasure". According to abolitionist Henry Highland Garnet in 1862, he had met a slave who "had unwillingly fought on the side of Rebellion", but the slave had since defected to "the side of Union and universal liberty".

During the siege of Yorktown, The United States Army's elite sniper unit, the 1st United States Sharpshooters, was devastatingly effective at shooting Confederate artillerymen defending the city. In response, some Confederate artillery crews started forcing slaves to load the cannons. "They forced their negroes to load their cannon," reported a U.S. officer. "They shot them if they would not load the cannon, and we shot them if they did."

In other cases, under explicit orders from their commanders, Confederate armies would often forcibly kidnap free African American civilians during their incursions into Union territory, sending them south into Confederate territory and thus enslaving them, as was the case with the Army of Northern Virginia when it invaded Pennsylvania in 1863.

=== Treatment of black prisoners of war ===
The usage of black men as soldiers by the Union, combined with Abraham Lincoln's issuing of the Emancipation Proclamation, profoundly angered the Confederacy, with the Confederates calling it uncivilized. As a response, in May 1863, the Confederacy passed a law demanding "full and ample retaliation" against the United States, stating that any black person captured in "arms against the Confederate States" or giving aid and comfort to their enemies would be turned over to state authorities, where they could be tried as slave insurrectionists; a capital offense punishable with a sentence of death. However, Confederate authorities feared retaliation, and consequently no black prisoner was ever put on trial and executed.

James McPherson states that "Confederate troops sometimes murdered black soldiers and their officers as they tried to surrender. In most cases, though, Confederate officers returned captured black soldiers to slavery or put them to hard labor on southern fortifications." African American soldiers who served in the United States Colored Troops were often singled out by the Confederates and suffered extra violence when captured by them. They were often the victims of battlefield massacres and atrocities at the hands of the Confederates, most notably at Fort Pillow in Tennessee and at the Battle of the Crater in Virginia.

==== Prisoner exchanges with the United States ====
The Confederate law declaring black U.S. soldiers to be insurrectionist slaves, combined with the Confederacy's discriminatory mistreatment of captured black U.S. soldiers, became a stumbling block for prisoner exchanges between the United States and the Confederacy, as the U.S. government in the Lieber Code officially objected to the Confederacy's discriminatory mistreatment of prisoners of war on basis of color. The Republican Party's platform of the 1864 presidential election reflected this view, as it too condemned the Confederacy's discriminatory mistreatment of captured black U.S. soldiers. According to the authors of Liberty, Equality, Power, "Expressing outrage at this treatment, in 1863 the Lincoln administration suspended the exchange of prisoners until the Confederacy agree to treat white and black prisoners alike. The Confederacy refused."

== Statistics and size ==
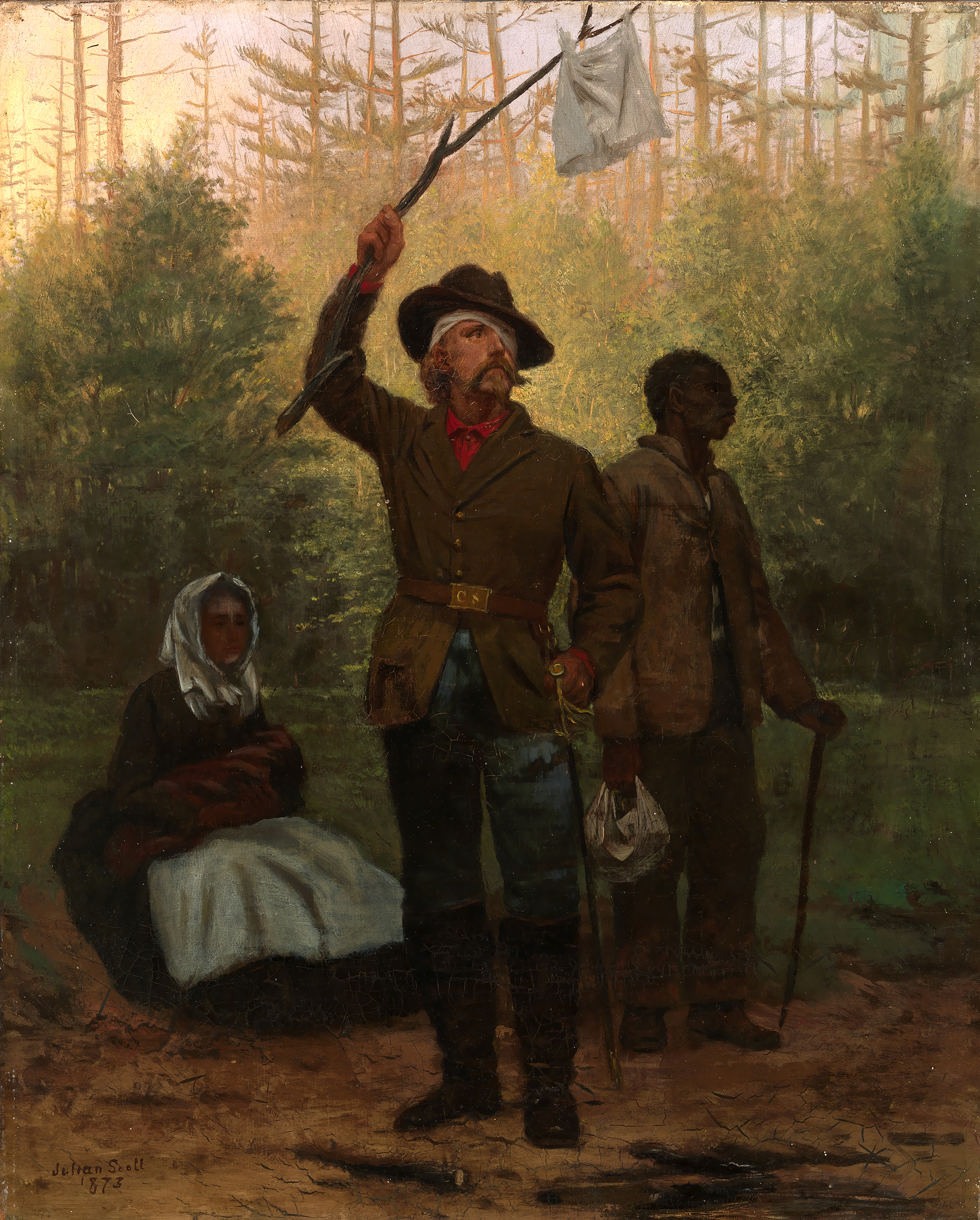
Julian Scott's 1873 painting, Surrender of a Confederate Soldier

Incomplete and destroyed records make an accurate count of the number of soldiers who served in the Confederate army impossible. Historians provide estimates of the actual number of individual Confederate soldiers between 750,000 and 1,000,000 troops.

The exact number is unknown. Since these figures include estimates of the total number of individual soldiers who served in each army at any time during the war, they do not represent the size of the armies at any given date. Confederate casualty figures are as incomplete and unreliable as the figures on the number of Confederate soldiers. The best estimates of the number of deaths of Confederate soldiers appear to be about 94,000 killed or mortally wounded in battle, 164,000 deaths from disease and between 26,000 and 31,000 deaths in Union prison camps. In contrast, about 25,000 Union soldiers died as a result of accidents, drowning, murder, killed after capture, suicide, execution for various crimes, execution by the Confederates (64), sunstroke, other and not stated. Confederate casualties for all these reasons are unavailable. Since some Confederate soldiers would have died for these reasons, more total deaths and total casualties for the Confederacy must have occurred. One estimate of the Confederate wounded, which is considered incomplete, is 194,026; another is 226,000. At the end of the war 174,223 men of the Confederate forces surrendered to the Union Army.

Compared to the Union Army at the time, the Confederate Army was not very ethnically diverse. Ninety-one percent of Confederate soldiers were native-born white men and only nine percent were foreign-born white men, Irishmen being the largest group with others including Germans, French, Mexicans, and British. A small number of Asian men were forcibly inducted into the Confederate Army against their will, when they arrived in Louisiana from overseas.

== See also ==
- Confederate States Navy
- Blockade runners of the American Civil War
- General in Chief of the Armies of the Confederate States
- Confederate Government Civil War units
- Confederate States Marine Corps
- Medicine in the American Civil War
- Military of the Confederate States of America
- Military uniforms of the Confederate States
- Bibliography of the American Civil War
- Postage stamps and postal history of the Confederate States
- Removal of Confederate monuments and memorials
