= Nathaniel Drake House =

Historic house in New Jersey, United States

- The Drake House Museum
- U.S. National Register of Historic Places
- New Jersey Register of Historic Places
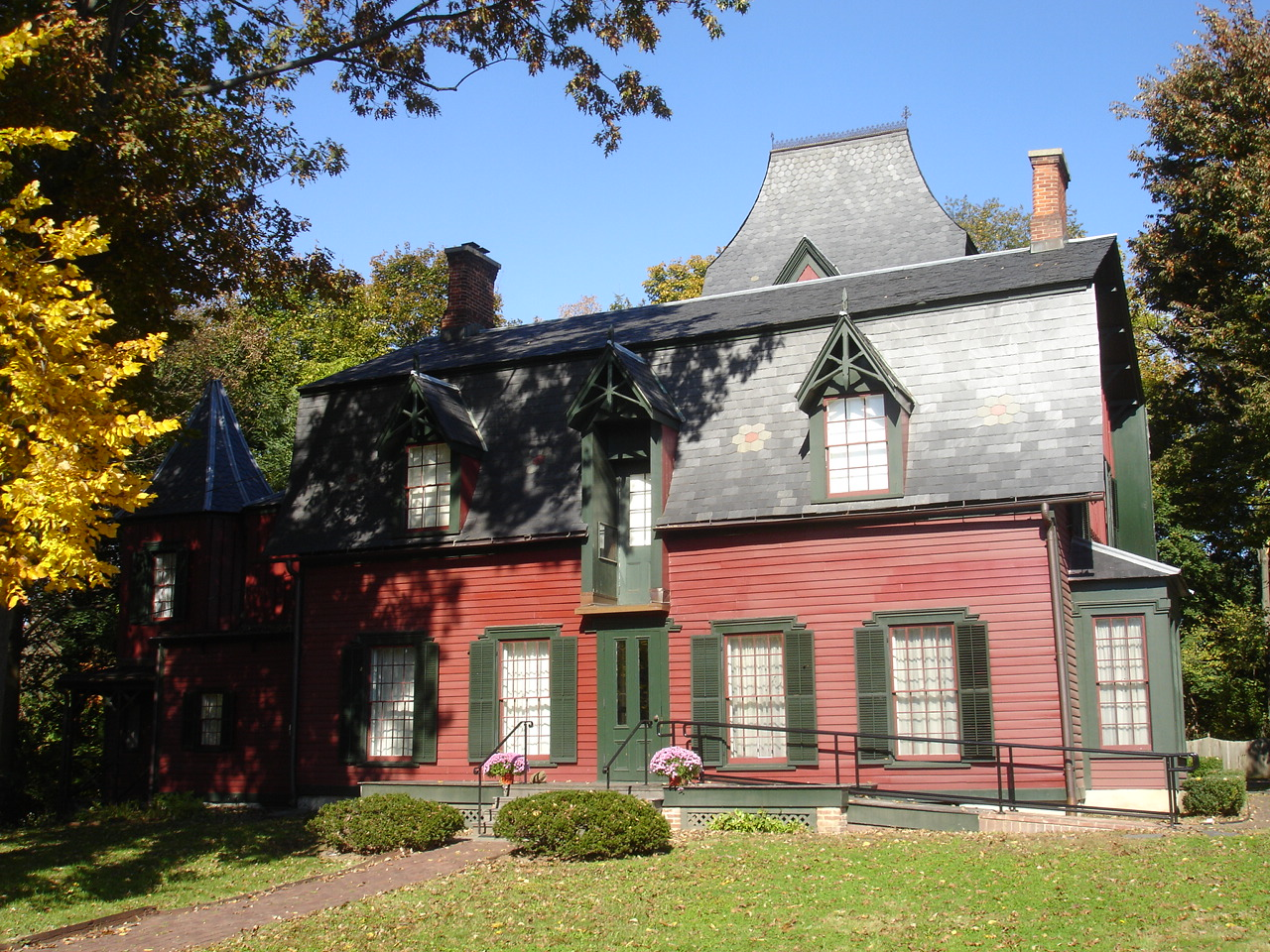

- Location within Union County, New Jersey Location within New Jersey Location within the United States
- Location: 602 West Front Street, Plainfield, New Jersey
- Coordinates: 40°36′49″N 74°25′56″W
- Area: 1 acre (0.40 ha)
- Built: 1746
- Architectural style: Gothic Revival
- NRHP reference No.: 73001135
- NJRHP No.: 2695

Significant dates
- Added to NRHP: June 19, 1973
- Designated NJRHP: January 29, 1973

The Drake House Museum is located at 602 West Front Street in the city of Plainfield in Union County, New Jersey. The house was built in 1746 and was added to the National Register of Historic Places on June 19, 1973, for its significance in architecture. It now operated as the Drake House Museum and is the headquarters of the Historical Society of Plainfield, though the building is owned by the City of Plainfield. The most famous piece in the Society's collection is the painting, "The Death of General Sedgwick" by Julian Scott.

== History ==
Issac Drake built the home in 1746 for his son Nathaniel Drake on the Old York Road. The original home was a 1 1/2-story building with four rooms and a lean-to kitchen. George Washington stayed at the home during the Battle of Short Hills in 1777. John S. Harberger purchased the home in 1864 and remodeled the building. Harberger's additions to the building included a mansard roof, ballroom, a 3-story tower in the rear of the building and a turret on the side of the home.

== See also ==
- National Register of Historic Places listings in Union County, New Jersey
- List of the oldest buildings in New Jersey
- List of museums in New Jersey
- List of Washington's Headquarters during the Revolutionary War
