= Surrender of a Confederate Soldier =

1873 painting by Julian Scott

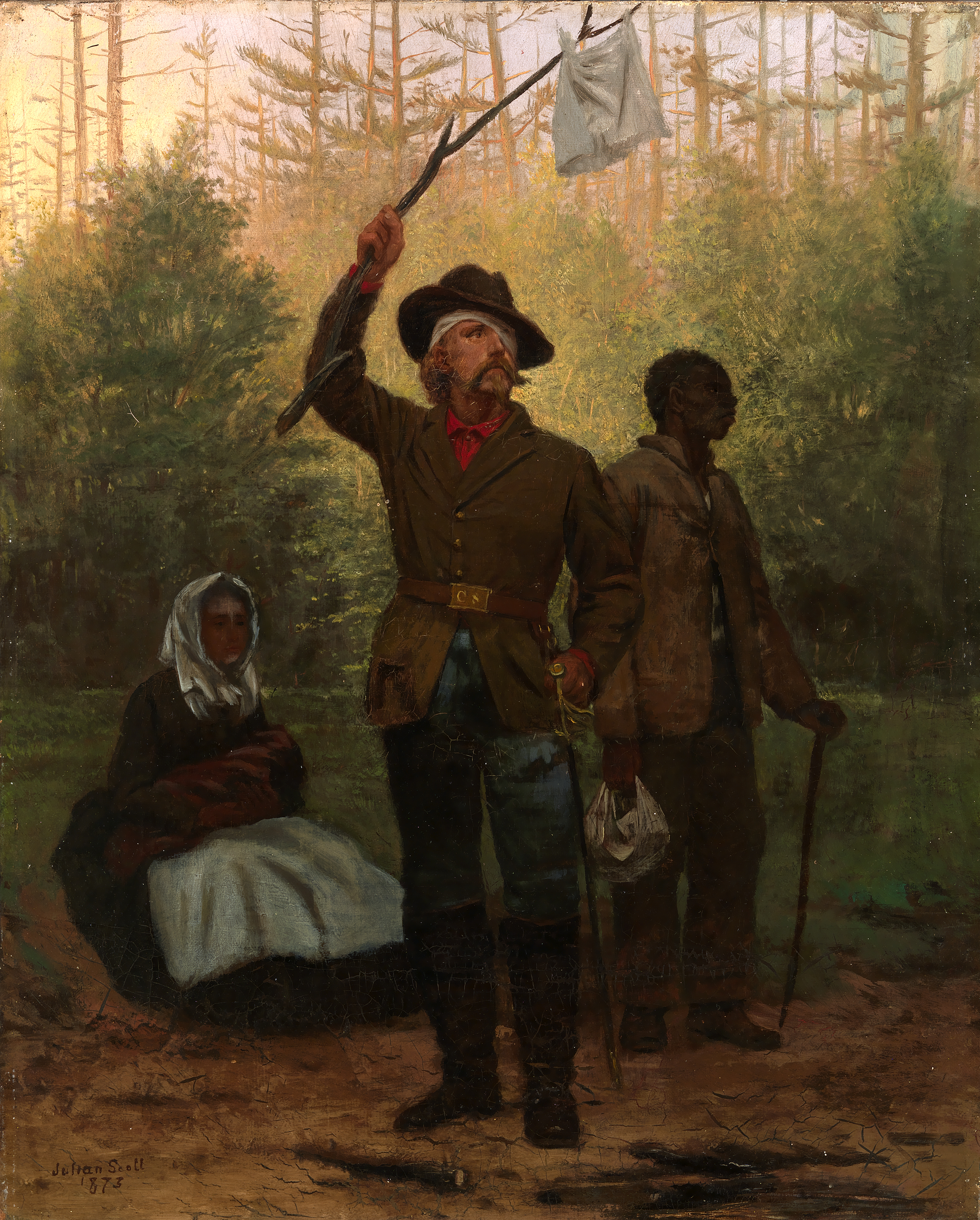
- Artist: Julian Scott
- Year: 1873
- Medium: Oil on canvas
- Location: Smithsonian American Art Museum; Washington, D.C.
- Owner: Smithsonian Institution

Surrender of a Confederate Soldier is an 1873 painting by Julian Scott in the collection of the Smithsonian American Art Museum. The painting depicts an injured soldier of the Confederate States Army in the American Civil War (1861 to 1865) waiving an improvised flag of surrender. The soldier is accompanied by black man and a woman holding an infant: the black man is presumed to be the soldier's slave, and the woman and infant are presumed to be his wife and child.

== Imagery and interpretation ==
Smithsonian curator Eleanor Jones Harvey included Surrender of a Confederate Soldier in her 2012 exhibition The Civil War and American Art. In her catalog for the exhibition, Harvey asserts that the painting is part of a genre of images, painted in the Union states of the North, that showed the dignified surrender of the Southern soldiers as a way of depicting the emotional trauma of their defeat, the uncertainty of their social and economic future, and the possibility of a peaceful long-term reconciliation between the North and South. The artist served in the Union army and was a Medal of Honor recipient.

== See also ==
- Lost Cause
