= Julian Scott =

United States Army Medal of Honor recipient (1846–1901)

Julian A. Scott
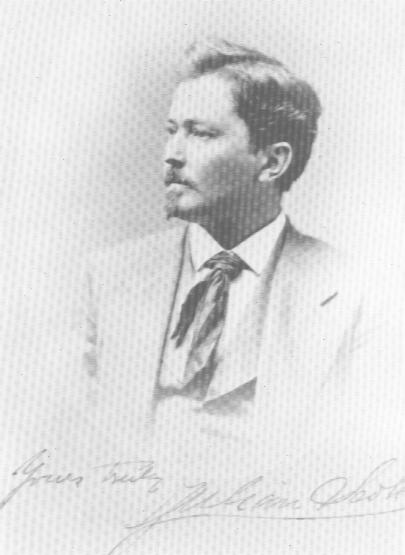
- Born: February 14, 1846; Johnson, Vermont, US
- Died: July 4, 1901 (aged 55); Plainfield, New Jersey, US
- Military career
- Allegiance: United States; Union
- Branch: United States Army; Union Army
- Service years: 1861 - 1863
- Rank: Drummer
- Unit: 3rd Vermont Infantry
- Conflicts: American Civil War; *Battle of Lee's Mills
- Awards: Medal of Honor

Julian A. Scott (February 14, 1846 – July 4, 1901), was born in Johnson, Vermont, and served as a Union Army drummer during the American Civil War, where he received America's highest military decoration the Medal of Honor for his actions at the Battle of Lee's Mills. He was also an American painter and Civil War artist.

== Family ==
Julian Scott was the fourth child, of eight, born to Charles Scott, a clockmaker, and his wife Lucy Kellum. Lucy Scott died in childbirth and Charles Scott remarried, in 1860, to Susan Pollard.

During the American Civil War, Julian's elder brother, Lucian, served with the 4th Regiment of the U.S. Artillery, was wounded at the Battle of Ball's Bluff, was taken prisoner in December 1864, and almost died at Libby Prison of starvation. Julian's younger brother, Charlie, enlisted at age 13 and became a bugler. After the war, Charlie moved to Missouri, then to Boston, where he became a physician. His brother, Percy, became an attorney in Illinois.

Scott married and had one daughter but, later, he and his wife separated.

== Biography ==
Scott received his early education at the Lamoille Academy, known today as Johnson State College where the main gallery is named in his memory. Scott continued his studies, graduating from the National Academy of Design in New York and subsequently studied under Emmanuel Leutze until 1868. During the Civil War, Scott enlisted in the 3rd Vermont Infantry on June 1, 1861, at the age of 15 as a fifer and, in February 1865, received the Medal of Honor for rescuing wounded soldiers while under enemy fire during the Battle at Lee's Mills, Virginia.

When the war was over, he traveled to Paris and Stuttgart to continue his education. Scott's 1872 masterwork, the Battle of Cedar Creek, is located at the Vermont State House. The painting illustrates the contributions of his home state of Vermont in the American Civil War and is significant for its absence of glorification of war and instead shows the suffering and human sacrifice associated with war. Scott traveled west as part of a census party, painting Native Americans in New Mexico, Arizona, and Oklahoma. Many of his works from this expedition now hang in the University of Pennsylvania Museum of Art.

In recent years his painting "Going Home" has received scholarly attention, especially by Brian Jordan, and is reproduced in one of his recent books. This painting features a black civilian, presumably an ex-slave, leading the procession of Union soldiers in a presumably northern direction. This depicts the kinship felt by many Union soldiers after the war with newly freed slaves as they viewed their enlistments as a form of slavery and now they and the former bondsmen were both free.

== Notable paintings ==
- "Rear-Guard at White Oak Swamp" (1869–1870);
- "Battle of Golding's Farm" (1871);
- "Battle of Cedar Creek" (1871–1872);
- "Surrender of a Confederate Soldier", Smithsonian American Art Museum Collection (1873);
- "The Recall" (1872)
- "On Board the Hartford" (1874);
- "Old Records" (1875);
- "Duel of Burr and Hamilton" (1876);
- "Reserves awaiting Orders" (1877);
- "In the Cornfield at Antietam" (1879);
- "Charge at Petersburg" (1882);
- "The War is Over" (1885);
- "The Blue and the Gray" (1886);
- "Going Home" (1887);
- "The Death Of General Sedgwick" (1887);
- "Portrait of George B. McClellan" (1888).
- "Encampment" (1884), (https://commons.wikimedia.org/wiki/File:Encampment_VA.jpg)

== Gallery ==
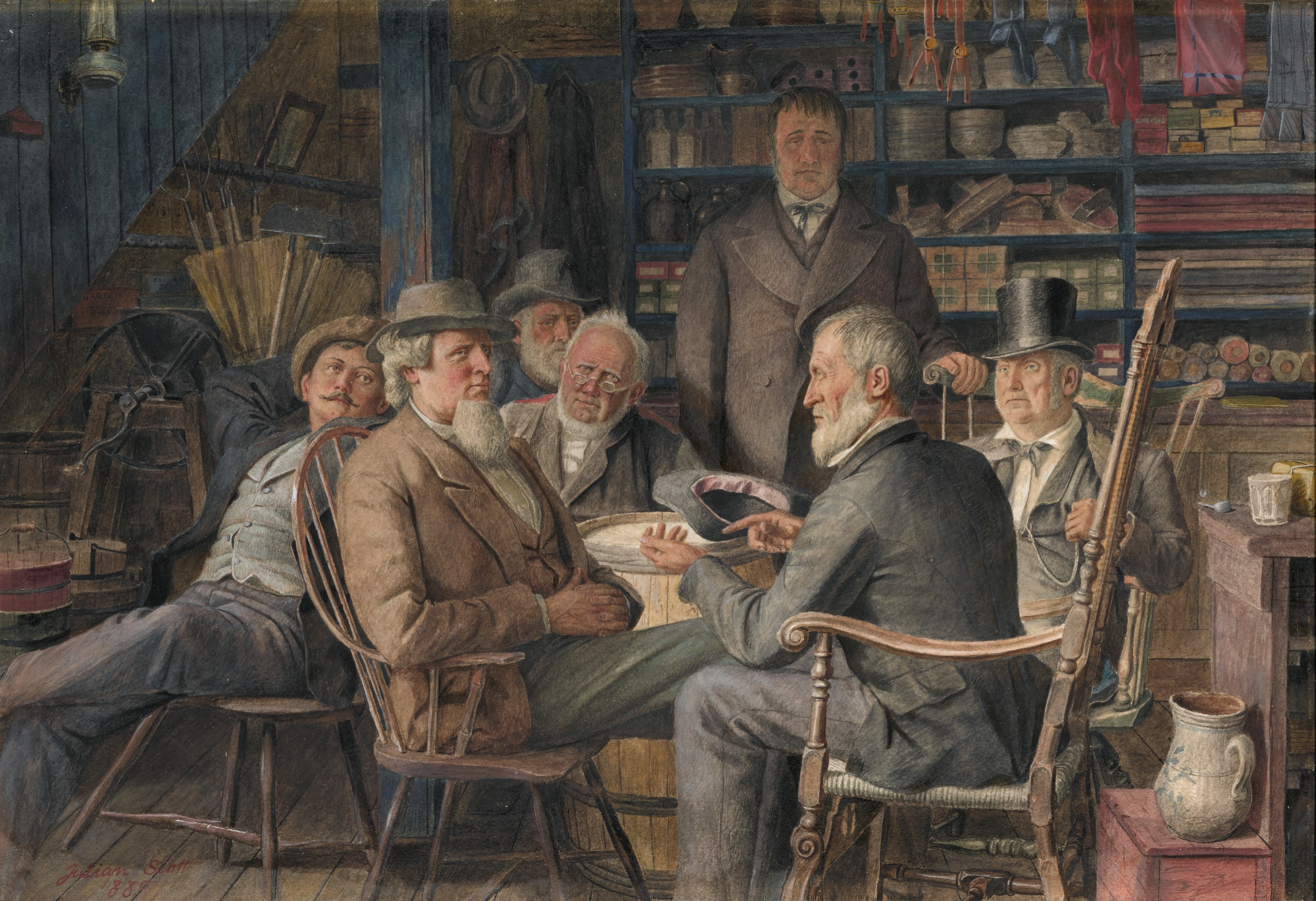
Village magnates (1880)

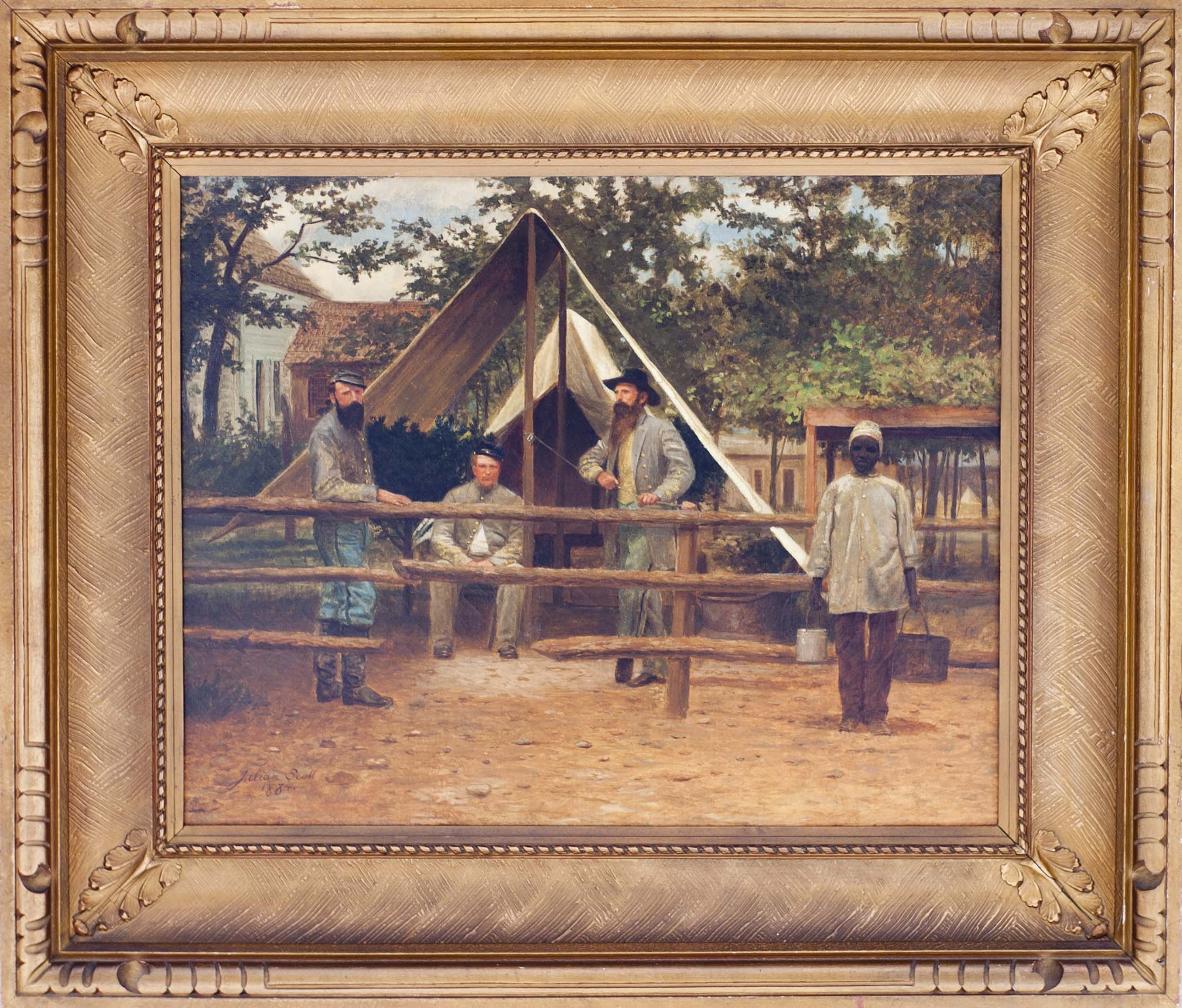
ENCAMPMENT 1884 (oil on canvas) - painted from photograph taken in Winchester, VA 1862. possibly Stonewall Jackson and Jeb Stewart together?

Portrait of fireman

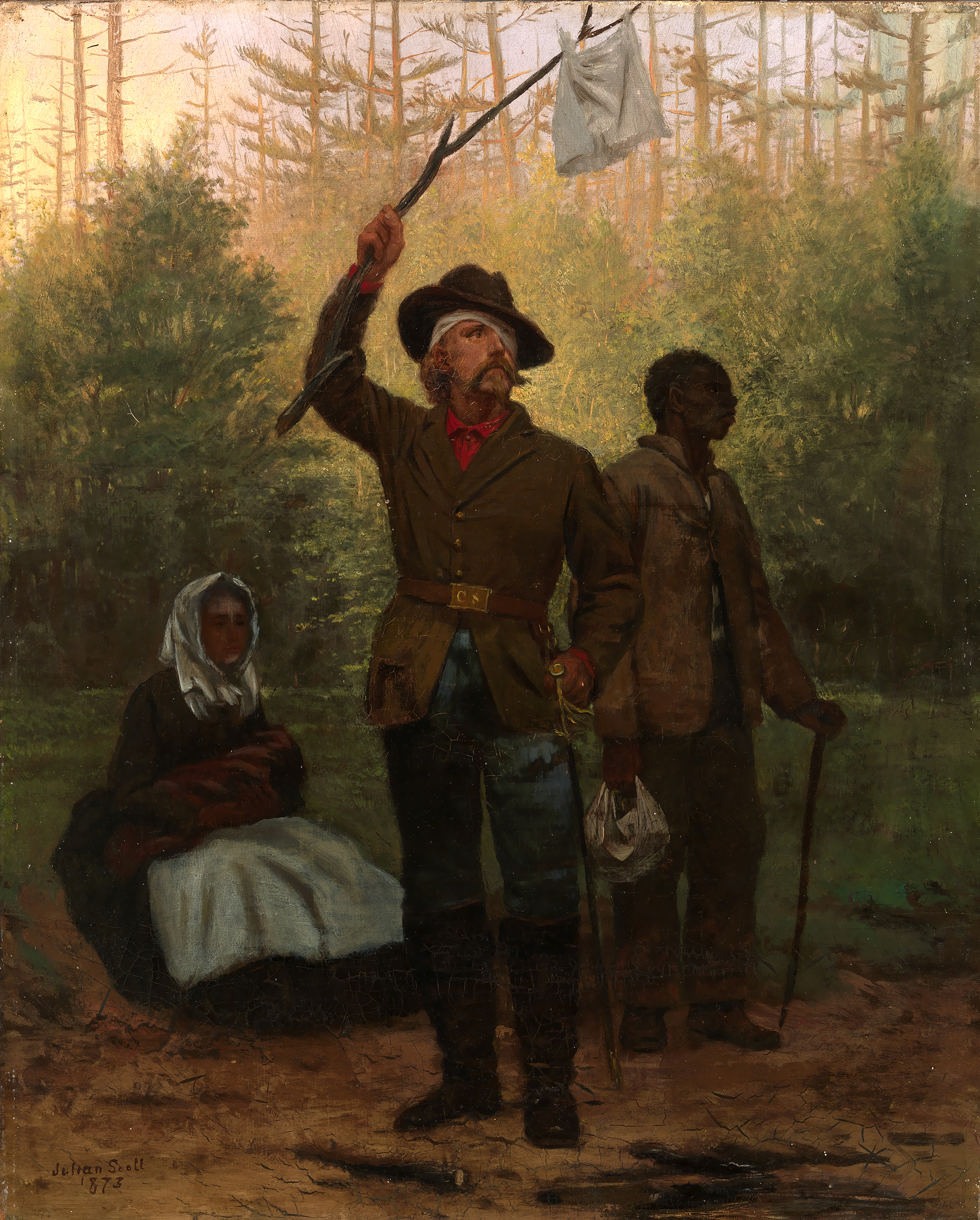
Surrender of a Confederate Soldier, oil on canvas, 1873, 19.5 x 15.5 in (49.5 × 39.4 cm) Smithsonian American Art Museum

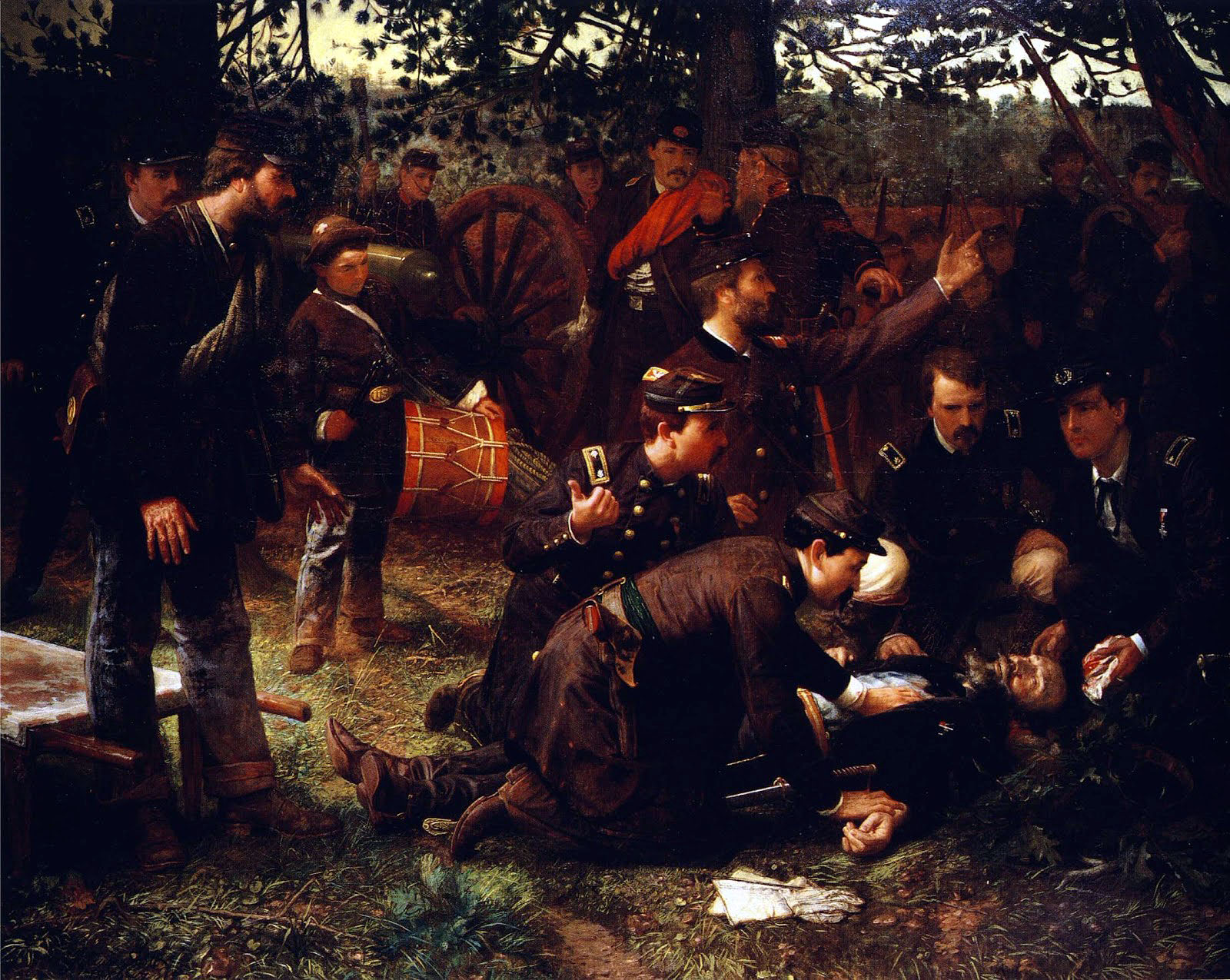
The Death of General Sedgwick, Nathaniel Drake House

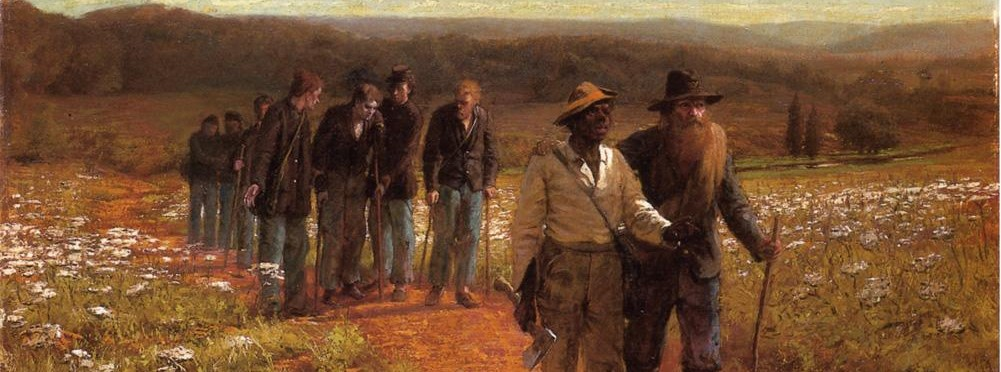
Going Home (1887)

== Medal of Honor citation ==

Rank and Organization:

Drummer, Company E, 3d Vermont Infantry. Place and date. At Lees Mills, Va., April 16, 1862. Entered service at. Johnson, Vt. Birth: Johnson, Vt. Date of issue: February 1865.

Citation:

Crossed the creek under a terrific fire of musketry several times to assist in bringing off the wounded.

== See also ==
- List of Medal of Honor recipients
- List of American Civil War Medal of Honor recipients: Q–S

== External sources ==
- "Julian Scott, Medal of Honor recipient". Medal of Honor citations. United States Army Center of Military History. June 8, 2009. Archived from the original on February 23, 2009.
- "Photographs of the painting "Battle of Cedar Creek" at the Vermont State House by Sara Lovering". Archived from the original on July 16, 2011.
- "Several paintings". Archived from the original on August 28, 2008.
- Native paths: American Indian art from the collection of Charles and Valerie Diker, an exhibition catalog from The Metropolitan Museum of Art (fully available online as PDF), which contains material on Julian Scott (cat. no. 1-3)
