= William Loring =

William Loring may refer to:

- William Loring (Royal Navy officer) (1811–1895), first Commander-in-Chief of the Australia Station
- William Loring (judge) (William Caleb Loring; 1851–1930), American lawyer and justice of the Massachusetts Supreme Judicial Court
- William Price Loring (1795–1878), Boston silversmith and customs officer, father of Charles Harding Loring
- William Wing Loring (1818–1886), American soldier during the Mexican-American War, American Civil War, and Ethiopian–Egyptian War
  - SS William W. Loring, a World War II Liberty ship named in his honor

== See also ==
- William Loring Andrews (1837–1920), American rare book collector, publisher, and librarian
- William Loring Spencer (married, formal name of May Nunez; 1847–1921), American author and actress, niece of William Wing Loring
- Loring (surname)
