= Troop engagements of the American Civil War, 1862 =

Years
1861
1862
1863
1864
1865
or return to the main page.

The following is a list of engagements that took place in 1862 during the American Civil War. During the summer and early spring of the year, Union forces gained several successes over the Confederacy, seizing control of Missouri, northern Arkansas, Kentucky, and western Tennessee, along with several coastal areas. Confederate forces defended the capital of Richmond, Virginia, from Union assaults, and then launched counter–offensives into Kentucky and Maryland, both of which end in Union victories.

== History ==
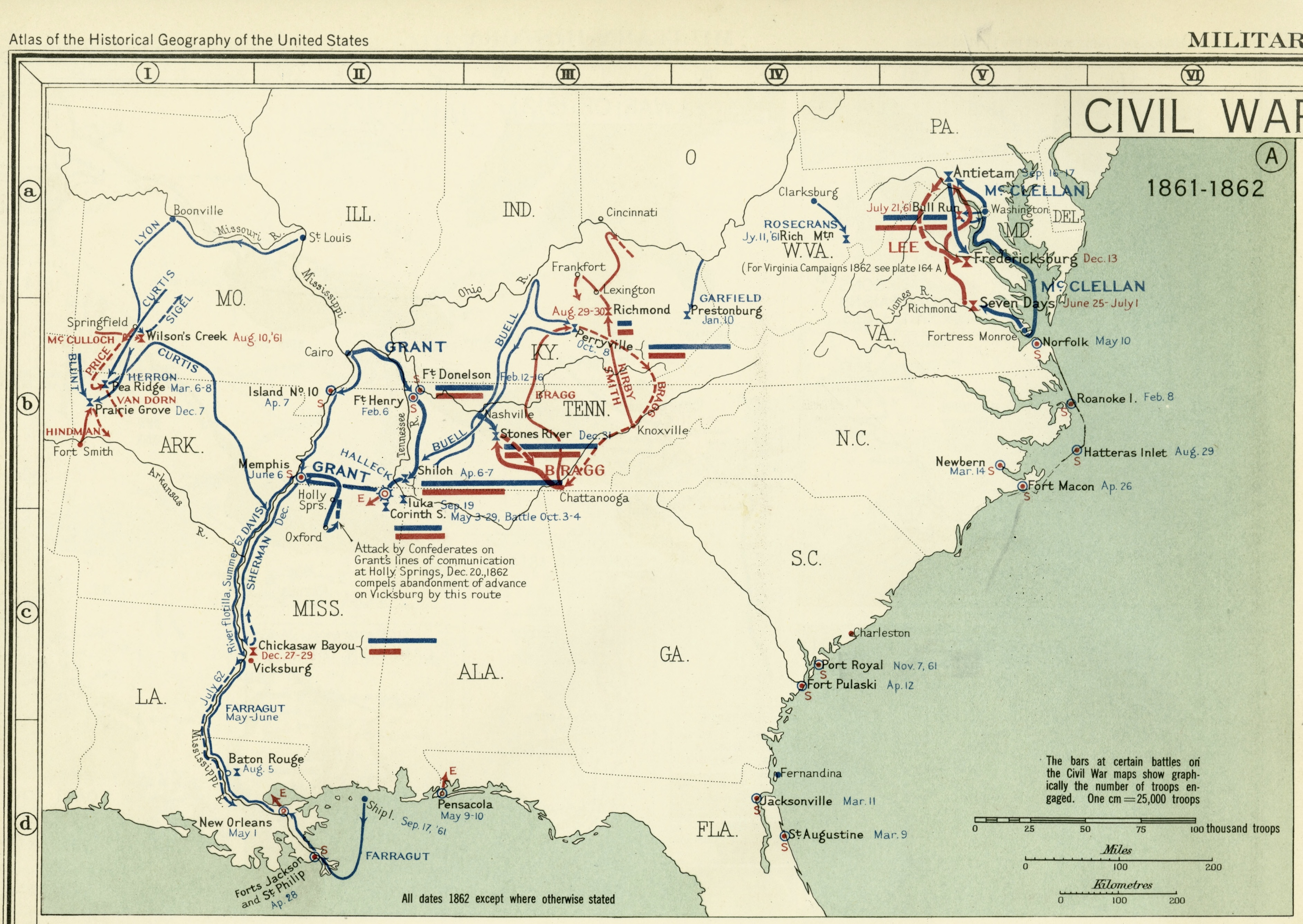
The American Civil War in 1861-1862.

In the Eastern Theater, the Union Army of the Potomac, commanded by Major General George B. McClellan, was transported to Fort Monroe in April to begin an offensive against Richmond, Virginia. Convinced that he was outnumbered by the Confederate Army of Northern Virginia, commanded by General Joseph E. Johnston, McClellan advanced cautiously, taking nearly a month to capture the Confederate defensive works near Yorktown and an additional month to march westward and arrive just outside Richmond. Here on May 31, Johnston attacked an isolated portion of the Union army in the Battle of Seven Pines; Johnston's plan failed, due to uncoordinated attacks and to Confederate columns which failed to arrive at their assigned positions, and Johnston was wounded during the battle. To replace Johnston, Confederate President Jefferson Davis choose General Robert E. Lee, who launched the Seven Days Battles in late June. While the Confederate attacks were often disjointed and several commands failed to arrive at their assigned destinations on time, Lee was still able to drive the Union army back to Harrison's Landing, forcing McClellan to give up his attempt to capture Richmond. Although he had driven the Union army away from the Confederate capital, Lee was disappointed that he had failed to destroy the Union army.

Lee then turned northward to deal with the Union Army of Virginia, commanded by Major General John Pope, planning to defeat Pope's army before it could unite with McClellan's army, which was arriving in northern Virginia from the Peninsula. During the Second Battle of Bull Run, Lee routed Pope's army and then invaded Maryland, hoping to seize supplies from Union territory and also hoping that a major Confederate victory in Northern territory would secure foreign recognition for the Confederacy. However, McClellan attacked Lee through the passes of South Mountain and forced Lee to call off his planned invasion of Pennsylvania, instead concentrating his army behind Antietam Creek. Neither army gained a victory at the Battle of Antietam on September 17, but Lee's retreat back to Virginia gave the Union a strategic victory in the campaign. During October and November, Union President Abraham Lincoln pressured McClellan to launch an aggressive campaign against Lee but McClellan refused, instead moving slowly and demanding supplies. Lincoln replaced McClellan on November 7 with Major General Ambrose Burnside, who hoped to cross the Rappahannock River near Fredericksburg, Virginia in order to get between Lee and Richmond. However, delays in obtaining a pontoon bridge prevented Burnside from crossing the river until December 11, by which time Lee was able to concentrate his entire army along a series of ridges near Fredericksburg. On December 13, Burnside attacked the Confederate positions and lost heavily; two days later he retreated back across the river and went into winter quarters.

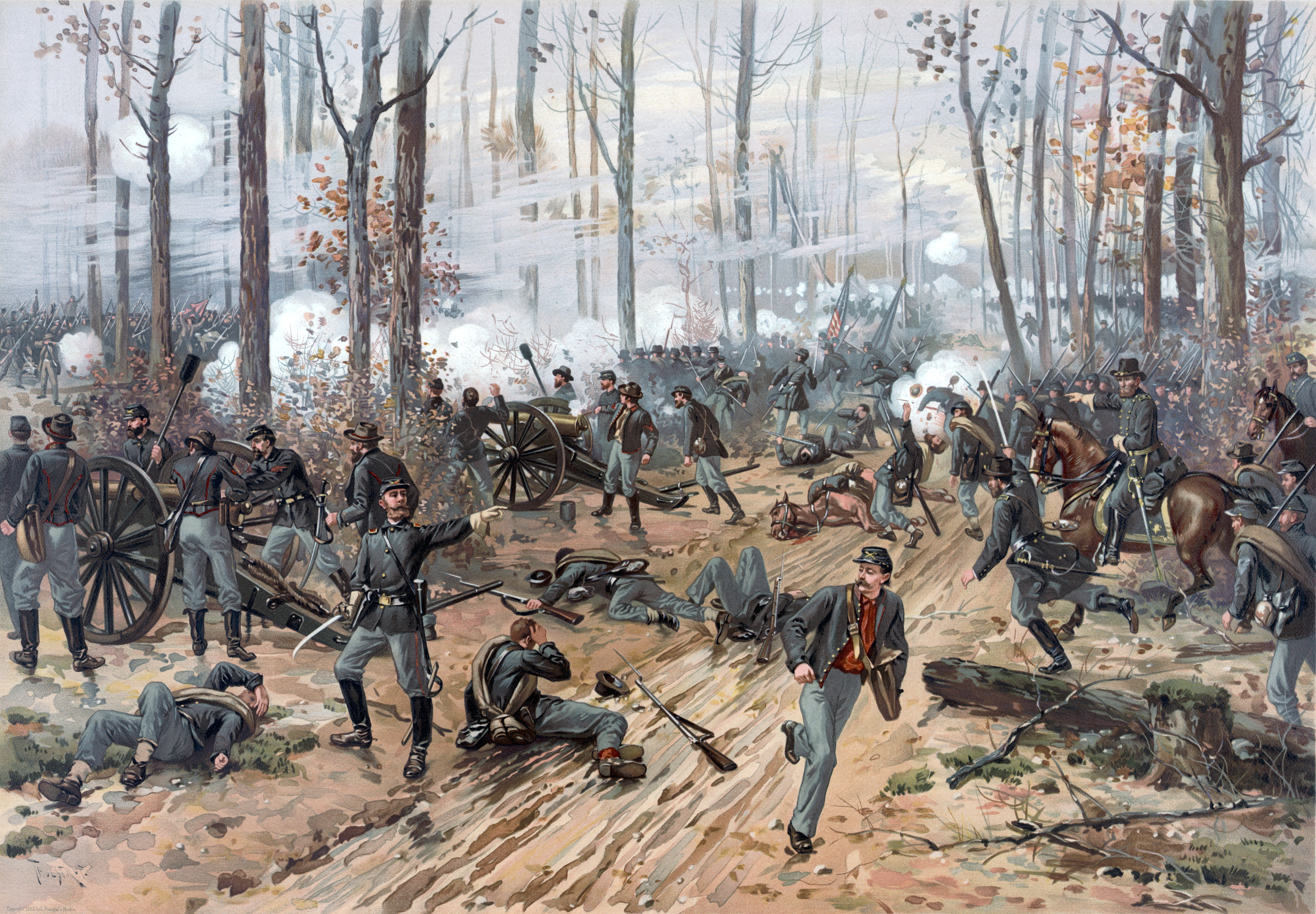
Battle of Shiloh by Thure de Thulstrup.

In the Western Theater, the Confederate forces, commanded by General Albert S. Johnston, were forced to abandon Kentucky and much of central and western Tennessee following the loss of Fort Donelson and Fort Henry in February. The capture of the two forts turned the Union commander in the battles, Major General Ulysses S. Grant, into a national hero. Johnston, following a plan proposed by his second-in-command General P. G. T. Beauregard, concentrated as many forces as he could near Corinth, Mississippi and attacked Grant's Army of the Tennessee near Shiloh Church. Although successful in driving the Union army almost into the Tennessee River on April 6, Johnston was mortally wounded during the battle, while Grant was reinforced during the night by the Army of the Ohio, commanded by Major General Don Carlos Buell. Grant then led a counterattack the following morning and drove the Confederates from the field, who then retreated back to their base at Corinth. Major General Henry W. Halleck took command of the Union forces operating in western Tennessee and advanced to Corinth, where both armies settled in for a month-long siege. Fearing that a full scale Union assault on the Confederate defenses was imminent, Beauregard evacuated Corinth during the night of May 29–30 without Halleck's forces finding out until the following morning.

Beauregard was relieved of command shortly afterwards, due to his health; Jefferson Davis replaced him with General Braxton Bragg. Following the Union victory at Corinth, Halleck dispersed his army across northern Mississippi, western Tennessee, and northern Alabama to protect the railroads, while sending Buell's Army of the Ohio eastward to capture Chattanooga, but problems with the Union supply lines prevented Buell from capturing the city. Bragg, pondering how to counteract the Union threat, received a message from Lieutenant General Edmund Kirby Smith, commander of the Confederate Department of East Tennessee, suggesting that the two combine forces to defeat Buell and retake Kentucky. Moving his troops by rail starting the end of June, Bragg arrived at Chattanooga near the end of July; from there he advanced into Kentucky towards the Ohio River. Buell moved north as well, managing to reach Louisville before Bragg did; from there he moved south towards Bragg. The two armies met in battle near Perryville, Kentucky on October 8; Bragg's forces attacked Buell's left wing but without success. Bragg retreated that night and united with Smith, intending to remain in Kentucky, but when Buell threatened his line of retreat, Bragg move south for Tennessee.

The Union navy, in concert with the army, captured several more coastal areas along the Atlantic seaboard and Gulf coast. Following the Union victory at Hatteras Inlet the previous year, other parts of the North Carolina coast, including New Berne, were captured; in April, Union forces attacked and captured Fort Pulaski in Georgia following a thirty hour bombardment, cutting off Savannah from blockade runners. This victory left Wilmington, North Carolina as the only major Atlantic port to remain in Confederate hands. Several ports in Florida and along the Gulf coast were captured as well, including Apalachicola and St. Augustine in Florida and Biloxi, Mississippi. In April, a Union squadron commanded by Commodore David Farragut ran past Forts Jackson and St. Philip near the mouth of the Mississippi River and forced the surrender of New Orleans, the largest Confederate port city in both population and in trade volume.

In the Trans-Mississippi Theater, the Confederates launched several offensive campaigns, all of which failed. In late January, Union Major General Samuel R. Curtis maneuvered the Missouri State Guard out of the state and into northwestern Arkansas; due to a shortage of supplies, Curtis had to halt his advance in the area of Pea Ridge. In response to the Union advance, Confederate President Jefferson Davis sent Major General Earl Van Dorn to Arkansas to take command of the Confederate forces in the state. After he arrived in early March, Van Dorn launched an offensive of his own, which resulted in the two-day Battle of Pea Ridge, a Confederate defeat. After the battle, he was ordered to take his army east of the Mississippi River and join the Confederate army at Corinth, Mississippi, but he arrived too late to fight in the Battle of Shiloh.

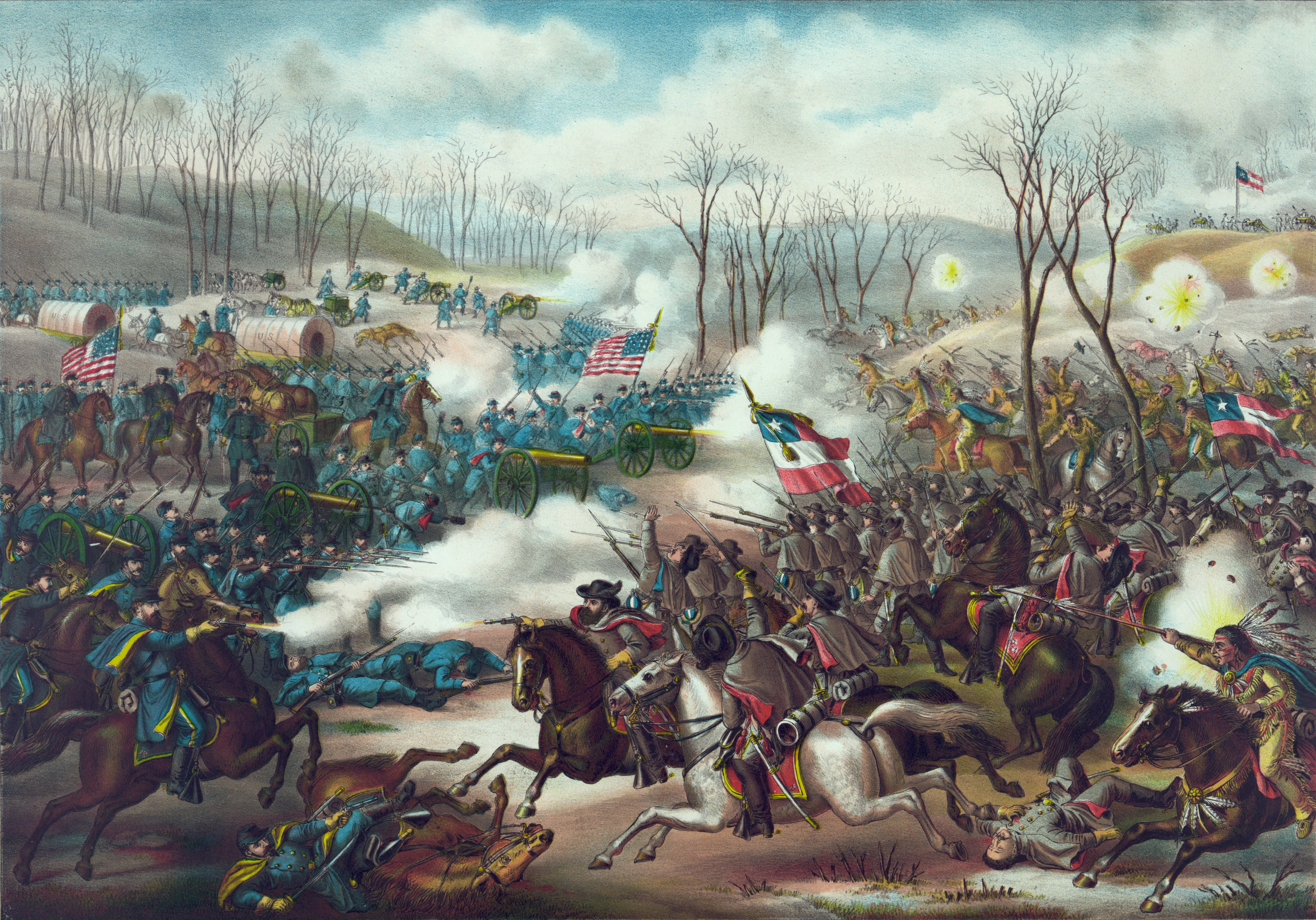
Battle of Pea Ridge, Ark., by Kurz and Allison.

In Texas, Brigadier General Henry Sibley raised a brigade of cavalry and led it into the New Mexico Territory, intending to drive the remaining Union forces from it and advance into Colorado, capturing the gold and silver mines located in the territory. He fought the main Union force in the territory, commanded by Colonel Edward R.S. Canby, at the Battle of Valverde on February 17; although the battle was a Confederate victory, Sibley failed to force Canby to surrender. Instead, Sibley continued northward, leaving Canby in his rear. Continuing northward along the Rio Grande and the Santa Fe Tail, his brigade met a Union force, which included the 1st Colorado Infantry, at Glorieta Pass on March 28. The Confederates again drove the Union force from the field, but during the battle a Union detachment burned most of the Confederate supply train, along with most of their supplies. This meant that the Confederates had to retreat back to Texas, reaching it by mid-April, losing over 1,500 men out of an original force of 3,700 men.

== Engagements ==
Date	Engagement	Military units	Losses	Victor (if applicable)
January 3	Cockpit Point, Virginia	Confederate Department of Northern Virginia, Union Potomac Flotilla	none	Inconclusive
January 5–6	Hancock, Maryland	Confederate Valley District, Department of Northern Virginia, Union garrison	25 total	Inconclusive
January 8	Roan's Tan Yard, Missouri	Missouri State Guard, Union Department of the Missouri	Missouri State Guard 80, Union 11	USA
January 10	Middle Creek, Kentucky	Confederate Army of Central Kentucky, Union Army of the Ohio	Confederate 65, Union 27	USA
January 11	Lucas Bend, Columbus, Kentucky	Confederate CSS Grampus and two steamers, Union U.S.S. Essex	none	Inconclusive
January 19	Mill Springs, Kentucky	Confederate Department No. 2, Union Army of the Ohio.	Confederate 350, Union 232	USA
February 6	Fort Henry, Tennessee	Confederate garrison, Union navy	Confederate 99, Union 47.	USA
February 6	Roanoke Island, North Carolina	Confederate garrison, Union North Atlantic Blockading Squadron	Confederate 2,643, Union 264	USA
February 14–16	Fort Donelson, Tennessee	Confederate garrison, Union Army of the Tennessee	Confederate 17,000 (including 13,829 prisoners), Union 2,852	USA
February 17	Little Sugar Creek, Arkansas	Confederate forces, Union Army of the Southwest	Confederate unknown, Union 33	Inconclusive
February 21	Fort Craig or Valverde, New Mexico	Confederate Army of New Mexico, Union Department of New Mexico	Confederate 187, Union 263	CSA
February 23	Socorro, New Mexico	Confederate 5th Texas Mounted Rifles, Union 2nd New Mexico Militia	unknown	CSA
March 6–8	Pea Ridge, Arkansas	Confederate Army of the West and Missouri State Guard, Union Army of the Southwest	Confederate 2,000, Union 1,384	USA
March 8–9	Hampton Roads, Virginia	Confederate gunboat CSS Virginia, Union gunboats Monitor, Minnesota, Congress, and Cumberland.	Confederate 24, Union 409	•Tactical: Inconclusive Strategic: USA
March 14	New Berne, North Carolina	Confederate garrison, Union North Carolina Expeditionary Corps	Confederate 609, Union 476	USA
March 23	Kernstown, Virginia	Confederate Army of the Valley, Union division, V Corps	Confederate 718, Union 590	•Tactical: USA •Strategic: CSA
March 25	La Villa, Florida	Confederate 4th Florida Infantry, Union 4th New Hampshire Infantry	Confederate one, Union eight	CSA?
March 26–28	Apache Canyon and Glorieta, near Santa Fe, New Mexico	Confederate Army of New Mexico, Union Department of New Mexico	Confederate 227, Union 132	USA
March 30	Stanwix Station, Arizona	Confederate Company A, Arizona Rangers, Union cavalry from California Column	Confederate none, Union 1 wounded	USA
April 5 – May 4	Yorktown, Virginia	Confederate Army of Northern Virginia, Union Army of the Potomac	Confederate 300, Union 182	Inconclusive
April 6–7	Shiloh, Tennessee	Confederate Army of Mississippi, UnionArmy of West Tennessee, Army of the Ohio and U.S. Gunboats Tyler and Lexington.	Confederate 10,699, Union 13,047	USA
April 8	Island No. 10, Tennessee	Confederate Department No. 2, Union Army of the Mississippi	Confederacy 3,017 (including 3,000 prisoners), Union 51	USA
April 8	Albuquerque, New Mexico	Confederate Army of New Mexico, Union Department of New Mexico	unknown	USA
April 10–11	Ft. Pulaski, Georgia	Confederate garrison, Union South Carolina Expeditionary Corps	Confederate 1, Union 1	USA
April 14	Fort Pillow, Tennessee	Union mortar boats bombard Fort Pillow	none	CSA
April 14	Las Padillas, New Mexico	Confederate detachment from Army of New Mexico, Union New Mexico militia	unknown	USA?
April 15	Picacho Pass, Arizona	Confederate Company A, Arizona Rangers, Union company of 1st California Cavalry.	Confederate 6, Union 6.	CSA
April 15	Peralta, New Mexico Territory	Confederate Army of New Mexico, Union Department of New Mexico	Confederate 33, Union unknown	USA
April 16–28	Forts Jackson and St. Philip, Louisiana	Confederate Department No. 1, Union West Gulf Blockading Squadron	Confederate 782, Union 229	USA
April 19	Camden, North Carolina, also called South Mills	Confederate garrison, Union detachment from North Carolina Expeditionary Corps	Confederate 25, Union 114	CSA
April 25	Fort Macon, North Carolina	Confederate garrison, U.S. Gunboats Daylight, Georgia, Chippewa, the bark Gemsbok, and North Carolina Expeditionary Corps	Confederate 439, Union 3	USA
April 25 – May 1	New Orleans, Louisiana (surrender to Union forces)	Union West Gulf Blockading Squadron	none	USA
April 29 – May 30	Corinth, Mississippi	Confederate Army of Mississippi, Union Army of the Mississippi, Army of West Tennessee, and Army of the Ohio	Confederate 1,000, Union 1,000	USA
May 5	Williamsburg, Virginia	Confederate Army of Northern Virginia, Union III and IV Corps Army of the Potomac	Confederate 1,582, Union 2,283	Inconclusive
May 7	West Point or Eltham's Landing, Virginia	Confederate Army of Northern Virginia, Union Army of the Potomac	Confederate 48, Union 186	Inconclusive
May 8	McDowell, Virginia	Confederate Army of the Valley and Army of the Northwest, Union Mountain Department	Confederate 500, Union 256	CSA
May 10	Plum Run Bend, Tennessee	Confederate River Defense Fleet, Union Mississippi River Squadron	Confederate four ships disabled, Union two ships sunk	CSA
May 15	Fort Darling, James River, Virginia	Confederate garrison, U.S. Gunboats Galena, Port Royal, Naugatuck, Monitor, and Aroostook.	Confederate 15, Union 24	CSA
May 15–17	Princeton, West Virginia	Confederate Army of East Kentucky, Union District of the Kanawha, Mountain Department	Confederate 16, Union 129	CSA
May 19	Whitney's Lane, Arkansas	Confederate Trans-Mississippi Department, Union Army of the Southwest	Confederate 150, Union 45	USA
May 23	Front Royal, Virginia	Confederate Army of the Valley, Union Department of the Shenandoah	Confederate 56, Union 904	CSA
May 23	Fort Craig, New Mexico	Confederate detachment Army of New Mexico, Union 3rd U.S. Cavalry	Confederate unknown, Union 3 wounded	USA
May 25	Winchester, Virginia	Confederate Army of the Valley, Union Department of the Shenandoah	Confederate 400, Union 2,019	CSA
May 27	Hanover Courthouse, Virginia	Confederate brigade, Army of Northern Virginia	Confederate 746, Union 355	USA
May 27	Dragoon Springs, Arizona	Confederate Company A, Arizona Rangers, Chiricahuas	unknown	CSA?
May 31 – June 1	Seven Pines and Fair Oaks, Virginia	Confederate Army of Northern Virginia, Union Army of the Potomac.	Confederate 6,100, Union 5,000	USA
June 5	Tranter's Creek, North Carolina	Confederate 44th North Carolina Infantry, Union 24th Massachusetts Infantry	40 total	USA
June 6	Memphis, Tennessee	Confederate River Defense Fleet, Union Mississippi Flotilla.	Confederate 180, Union 1	USA
June 6	Good's Farm near Harrisonburg, Virginia	Detachments from Confederate Army of the Valley District and Union Mountain Department	Confederate 67, Union 63	CSA
June 7 – 8	Chattanooga I, Tennessee	Confederate and Union forces	Confederate 3, Union unknown	USA
June 8	Cross Keys or Union Church, Virginia	Confederate Army of the Valley, Union Mountain Department	Confederate 288, Union 684	CSA
June 9	Port Republic, Virginia	Confederate Army of the Valley, Union Department of the Rappahannock	Confederate 800, Union 800–1,000	CSA
June 16	Secessionville, James Island, South Carolina	Confederate Department of South Carolina, Georgia, and Florida, Union Department of the South	Confederate 204, Union 683	CSA
June 17	St. Charles, White River, Arkansas	Confederate garrison, Union Gunboats Lexington, Mound City, Conestoga, and St. Louis.	Confederate 40, Union 160	USA
June 21	Simmon's Bluff, South Carolina	Confederate Department of South Carolina, Georgia, and Florida, Union Department of the South	none	USA
June 26 – July 1	The Seven Days Battles, Virginia : Including engagements known as Oak Grove, Virginia on the 25, Mechanicsville on the 26, Gaines' Mills on the 27, Garnett's and Golding's Farm on the 27 and 28, Savage Station on the 29, White Oak Swamp and Glendale on the 30, and Malvern Hill on July 1.	Confederate Army of Northern Virginia, Union Army of the Potomac	Confederate 20,614, Union 15,849	Overall: CSA --------------- Oak Grove: Inconclusive --------------- Mechanicsville: •Tactical: USA •Strategic: CSA --------------- Gaines' Mill: CSA --------------- Garnett's and Golding's Farm: Inconclusive ---------------- Savage Station: Inconclusive ---------------- White Oak Swamp: Inconclusive ---------------- Glendale: Inconclusive ---------------- Malvern Hill: •Tactical: USA
July 3	Evelington Heights, Virginia (near Harrison's Landing)	Confederate cavalry from Army of Northern Virginia, Union Army of the Potomac	none	USA
July 7	Cache River, Arkansas	Confederate cavalry, Union Army of the Southwest	Confederate 272, Union 63	USA
July 13	Murfreesboro, Tennessee	Confederate cavalry, Union garrison	Confederate 150, Union 1,200	CSA
July 15	Apache Pass, New Mexico Territory (modern-day Arizona)	Apaches, Union California Column	unknown	USA
August 5	Baton Rouge, Louisiana	Confederate Army of West Tennessee, Union Department of the Gulf	Confederate 478, Union 371	USA
August 6–9	Kirksville, Missouri	Missouri State Guard, Union cavalry.	Confederate 368, Union 88	USA
August 9	Cedar Mountain, Virginia	Confederate Left Wing, Army of Northern Virginia, Union Army of Virginia	Confederate 1,400, Union 2,500	CSA
August 11	Independence, Missouri	Missouri State Guard, Union garrison.	Missouri State Guard unknown, Union 344	CSA
August 15–16	Lone Jack, Missouri	Confederate and Union cavalry	Confederate unknown, Union 272	CSA
August 19	New Ulm, Minnesota	Dakotas, Union civilians	Dakotas unknown, civilians 59	USA
August 22	Big Hill, Kentucky	Cavalry from Confederate Department of East Tennessee and Union Army of the Ohio	Confederate 16, Union 270	CSA
August 20–22	Fort Ridgely, Minnesota	Mdewakanton Dakotas, Union garrison	Mdewakanton Dakotas unknown, Union 26	USA
August 23	New Ulm, Minnesota	Dakotas, Union civilians, militia	Dakotas unknown, Civilians, Minnesota militia 10 killed, 50 wounded	USA
August 23–25	Rappahannock Station, Virginia	Confederate Army of Northern Virginia, Union Army of Virginia	225 total	Inconclusive
August 26–27	Manassas Station, Virginia	Confederate Left Wing, Army of Northern Virginia, Union detachments from Army of Virginia and Army of the Potomac	Confederate 173, Union 1,144	CSA
August 28	Thoroughfare Gap, Virginia	Confederate Right Wing, Army of Northern Virginia, Union detachment, Army of Virginia	100 total	CSA
August 28– 30	Second Battle of Bull Run or Manassas, Virginia	Confederate Army of Northern Virginia, Union Army of Virginia (with units of Army of the Potomac attached)	Confederate 3,353, Union 13,826	CSA
August 30	Richmond, Kentucky	Confederate Department of East Tennessee, Union Army of the Ohio	Confederate 603, Union 5,600	CSA
August 30	Bolivar, Tennessee	Detachments from Confederate Army of the West and Union Army of the Mississippi	Confederate 100, Union 87	Inconclusive?
September 1	Chantilly, Virginia	Confederate Left Wing, Army of Northern Virginia, Union Army of Virginia and Army of the Potomac	Confederate 800, Union 1,300:	Inconclusive
September 1	Denmark, Mississippi	Detachments of Confederate Army of the West and Union Army of the Mississippi	Confederate 288, Union 88	USA
September 2 – 3	Birch Coulee, Minnesota	Dakotas, Union Department of the Northwest	Dakotas unknown, Union 19	Dakota
September 3 – 6	Fort Abercrombie, Minnesota	Dakotas, Yanktons, and Yanktonais, Union Company D, 5th Minnesota Infantry	Dakotas unknown, Union five	USA?
September 12 – 15	Harper's Ferry, Virginia	Confederate Left Wing, Army of Northern Virginia, Union garrison	Confederate 286, Union 12,719 (including 12,500 captured)	CSA
September 14	Turner's and Crampton's Gap, South Mountain, Maryland	Confederate Army of Northern Virginia, Union Army of the Potomac	Confederate 2,300, Union 2,325	USA
September 14 – 16	Munfordville, Kentucky	Confederate Army of Mississippi, Union garrison	Confederate 285, Union 4,148	CSA
September 17	Antietam, Maryland	Confederate Army of Northern Virginia, Union Army of the Potomac	Confederate 10,300, Union 12,400	•Tactical: Inconclusive •Strategic: USA
September 19 – 20	Iuka, Mississippi	Confederate Army of the West, Union Army of the Mississippi	Confederate 594, Union 790	USA
September 20	Blackford's Ford, Sheppardstown, Virginia	Confederate Army of Northern Virginia, Union V Corps, Army of the Potomac	Confederate 291, Union 363	CSA
September 23	Wood Lake, Minnesota	Dakotas, Union Department of the Northwest	Dakotas 25, Union 41	USA
September 30	Newtonia, Missouri	Confederate and Union cavalry	Confederate 78, Union 245	CSA
October 1 – 3	St. John's Bluff, Florida	Confederate Department of South Carolina, Georgia, and Florida, Union Department of the South	unknown	USA
October 3–4	Corinth, Mississippi	Confederate Army of West Tennessee, Union Army of the Mississippi.	Confederate 4,312, Union 2,520	USA
October 5	Hatchie Bridge or Davis Bridge, Tennessee	Confederate Army of West Tennessee, Union Army of the Mississippi	Confederate 337, Union 570	USA
October 8	Perryville, Kentucky	Confederate Army of Mississippi, Union Army of the Ohio	Confederate 3,396, Union 4,211	•Strategic: USA
October 22	Old Fort Wayne, Indian Territory	Confederate cavalry, Union division Army of the Frontier	Confederate 60–100, Union 10	USA
October 31–November 2	Bloomfield and Union, Loudoun County, Virginia	Cavalry from Confederate Army of the Potomac and Union Army of the Potomac.	Confederate 18, Union 12	Inconclusive
November 2	Philomont, Virginia	Cavalry from Confederate Army of Northern Virginia and Union Army of the Potomac.	Confederate 13, Union 15	USA?
November 27	Yellville, Arkansas	Confederate garrison, Union cavalry Army of the Frontier	Confederate 60 (all prisoners), Union none	USA
November 28	Cane Hill, Arkansas	Confederate cavalry, Trans-Mississippi Department, Union 1st Division Army of the Frontier.	Confederate 80, Union 44	•Tactical: CSA
December 4	Reed's Mountain, Arkansas	Cavalry from Confederate I Corps, Trans-Mississippi Department and Union Army of the Frontier	unknown	•Tactical: USA •Strategic: CSA
December 7	Prairie Grove, Arkansas	Confederate I Corps, Trans-Mississippi Department, Union Army of the Frontier.	Confederate 1,483, Union 1,251	USA
December 7	Hartsville, Tennessee	Confederate cavalry, Union detachment from Army of the Cumberland.	Confederate 139, Union 2,096	CSA
December 13	Fredericksburg, Virginia	Confederate Army of Northern Virginia, Union Army of the Potomac	Confederate 5,300, Union 12,600	CSA
December 14	Kinston, North Carolina	Confederate brigade, Union Department of North Carolina.	Confederate 525, Union 160	USA
December 16	White Hall, North Carolina	Confederate cavalry, Union Department of North Carolina	150 total	Inconclusive
December 17	Goldsborough Bridge, North Carolina	Confederate brigade, Union Department of North Carolina	220 total	USA
December 27-29	Chickasaw Bayou, Mississippi	Confederate Army of Vicksburg, Union XVII Corps	Confederate 187, Union 1,176	CSA
December 30	Parker's Cross Roads, Tennessee	Confederate Forrest's Cavalry Corps, Union infantry and artillery	Confederate 500, Union 237	CSA
December 31 – January 2	Murfreesboro' or Stone River, Tennessee	Confederate Army of Tennessee, Union Army of the Cumberland	Confederate 10,000, Union 13,000	USA

== See also ==
- Mississippi River campaigns in the American Civil War
