= Army of the Northwest =

Army of the Northwest may refer to:

- Army of the Northwest (Confederate), formed during the early American Civil War, and commanded by Robert S. Garnett, Henry R. Jackson, and William W. Loring
- Northwestern Army (Russia)
- Army of the Northwest (United States), formed during the War of 1812, and commanded by William Hull, James Winchester, and William Henry Harrison
