= Independent Battery F, Pennsylvania Light Artillery =

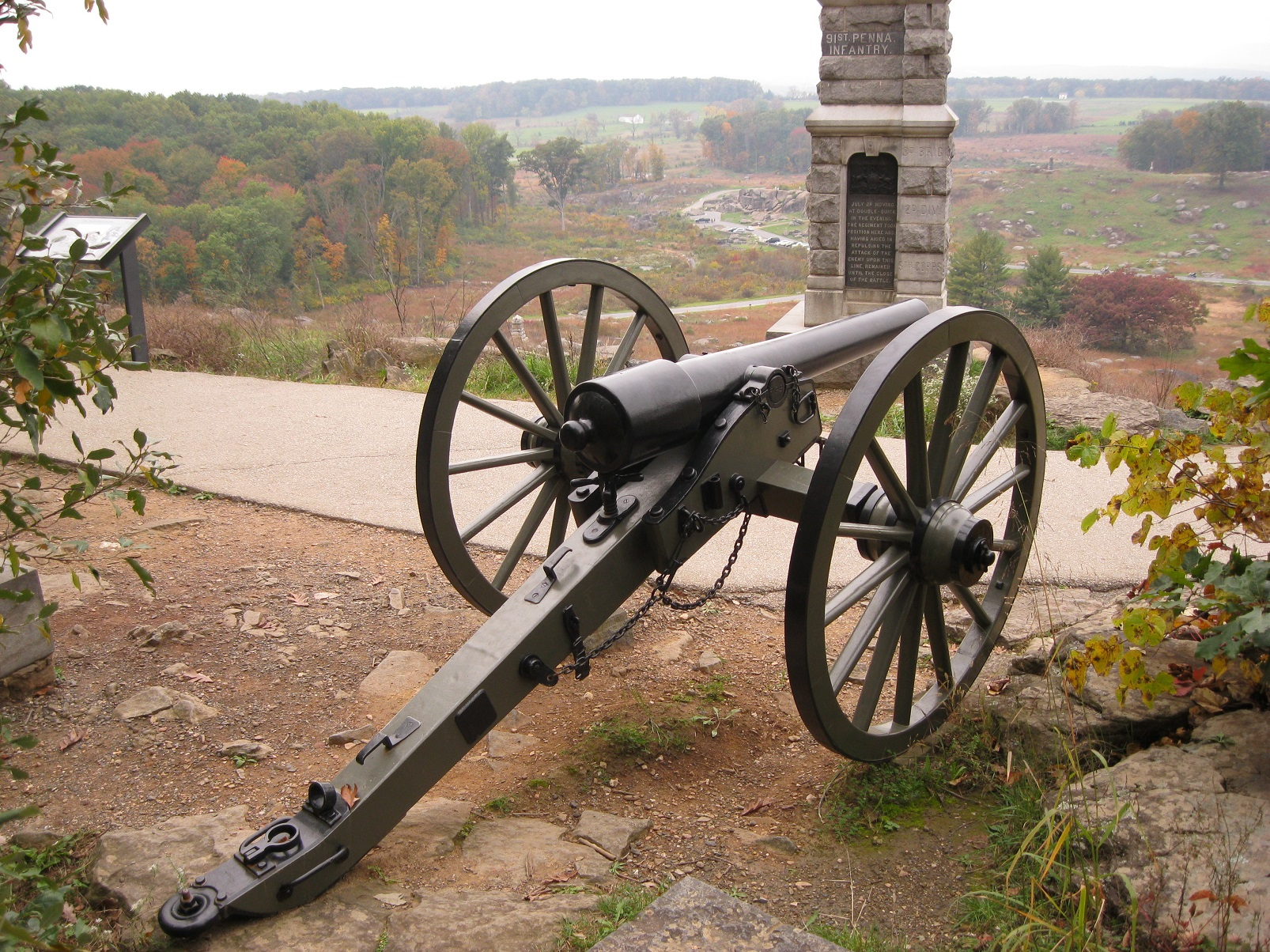
- Battery F, Pennsylvania Light Artillery was armed with 10-pounder Parrott rifles like the one shown here on Little Round Top at Gettysburg National Military Park.
- Active: 7 Dec. 1861 – 26 June 1865
- Country: United States
- Allegiance: (United States) Union; Pennsylvania
- Branch: Union Army
- Type: Field Artillery
- Size: Artillery Battery
- Equipment: 4 × 10-pounder Parrott rifles (1862)
- Engagements: American Civil War; Battle of Hancock (1862); First Battle of Winchester (1862); Battle of Sulphur Springs (1862); Second Battle of Bull Run (1862); Battle of Chantilly (1862); Battle of Antietam (1862); Battle of Chancellorsville (1863); Battle of Gettysburg (1863); Bristoe Campaign (1863); Battle of Mine Run (1863); Battle of Morton's Ford (1864)

Commanders
- Notable commanders: R. B. Hampton

Independent Battery F, Pennsylvania Light Artillery, also known as the "Pittsburg Battery", was an artillery battery that served in the Union Army during the American Civil War. Organized in December 1861, the unit first served in the Shenandoah Valley. Battery F fought at Hancock, Winchester, Sulphur Springs, Second Bull Run, Chantilly, and Antietam in 1862. The following year the unit fought at Chancellorsville, Gettysburg, the Bristoe Campaign, and Mine Run. In 1864–1865, Battery F fought at Morton's Ford and served in the garrisons of Washington, D.C., and Harper's Ferry, West Virginia before being mustered out in June 1865. One enlisted man from the battery received the Medal of Honor for heroic action at Gettysburg.

== Organizations ==
Battery F, Pennsylvania Light Artillery formed at Williamsport, Pennsylvania on 7 December 1861. The unit marched to the upper Potomac River where it joined Nathaniel P. Banks's command on 15 December. From that date until March 1862, Battery F was attached to Banks's Division, Army of the Potomac. From March to June 1862, the unit served with the 1st Division in Banks's V Corps and the Department of the Shenandoah. From June to September 1862, the unit belonged to the artillery of the II Corps, Army of Virginia. From September 1862 to May 1863, the battery was attached to the 2nd Division, XII Corps, Army of the Potomac. From May to October 1863, Battery F served in the 4th Volunteer Brigade of the Artillery Reserve, Army of the Potomac. From October 1863 to March 1864, the unit was in the Artillery Brigade, II Corps. Between March and May 1864, the battery moved to Camp Barry, Defenses of Washington, XXII Corps. From May to July 1864, it became part of 2nd Brigade, Gustavus De Russy's Division, XXII Corps. From July 1864 to January 1865, Battery F served in the Reserve Division, Department of West Virginia. Between January and March 1865, it was part of the 1st Separate Brigade, 3rd Division, West Virginia. In March and April, the battery became part of the Artillery Reserve, Army of the Shenandoah. From April to June 1865, the unit was in the 3rd Brigade, Martin D. Hardin's Division, XXII Corps, Department of Washington.

== History ==
=== 1861–1862 ===
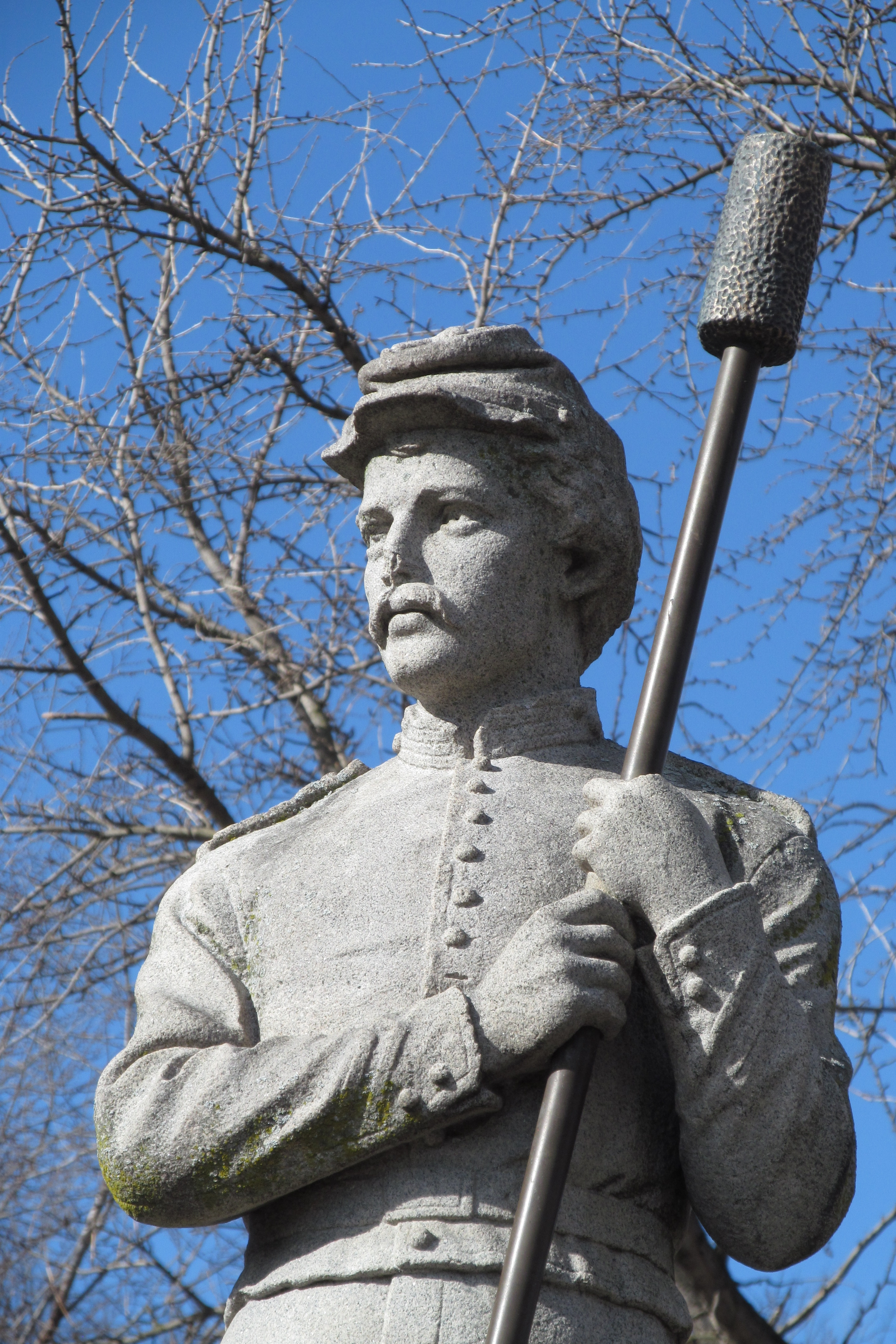
The Hampton Battery Memorial, erected in 1871 in Allegheny (now part of Pittsburgh), depicts a soldier of Independent Battery F

Independent Battery F, Pennsylvania Light Artillery was recruited at Pittsburgh and enlisted for a term of three years. The original officers were Captain Robert B. Hampton, First Lieutenant James P. Fleming, First Lieutenant Nathaniel Irish, Second Lieutenant Alfred N. Harbours. On 18 December 1861, the unit was engaged in a skirmish at Potomac River Dam No. 5. On 4–6 January 1862, the battery fought at the Battle of Hancock. On 26 February, Battery F crossed the Potomac with Banks's forces, heading south. The unit joined in the advance to Winchester, Virginia on 1–12 March, occupying the town on the latter date. The battery joined in the pursuit of Stonewall Jackson up the Shenandoah Valley 24 March – 27 April. There was skirmishing with Jackson's forces at Edinburg from 5–18 April. After that, Banks's troops advanced to Cross Keys where there was a skirmish on 26 April. At that point Banks began withdrawing.

On 23 May 1862, Jackson's reinforced Confederates wiped one of Banks's garrisons in the Battle of Front Royal and threatened to cut off Banks's division from Winchester. Banks ordered his outnumbered troops to retreat on 24 May from Strasburg and appointed John Porter Hatch to command his rearguard and burn any supplies that could not be carted off. Hatch's command included the 1st Vermont Cavalry and 5th New York Cavalry Regiments, 10 companies from two more cavalry regiments, one howitzer from 4th U.S. Artillery, Battery F, and Battery F, Pennsylvania Light. At 4:00 pm, one company of infantry, the depot guard, several cavalry companies, and Battery F found that Jackson's troops blocked the Valley Turnpike ahead of them at Middletown. After Captain Hampton and the other officers conferred, the small Union force retreated south to Strasburg, covered by Battery F's four Parrott rifles. One shell wounded eight soldiers from the 7th Louisiana Infantry Regiment while another exploded under Richard Taylor's horse without inflicting any injury. The Federal infantry, cavalry, and 35 wagons eventually escaped to Hancock, Maryland.

Battery F found its way back to Banks's main force where it fought in the First Battle of Winchester on 25 May. One two-gun section deployed on the Valley Turnpike with Winchester at its back. The other two-gun section took post on the Federal right flank. For almost two hours, 16 Union guns dueled with 26 Confederate guns. In the rout that followed, some Federal infantrymen complained that the fleeing cavalry and artillery threatened to trample those on foot. The Union reported losses of 71 killed, 243 wounded, and 1,714 missing, though many sick soldiers were left behind in the hospitals. Confederate losses were 68 killed, 329 wounded, and three missing.

On 29–30 June 1862, Battery F participated in a reconnaissance to Front Royal and Luray. The unit remained at Front Royal until August. Next, it served in John Pope's Northern Virginia campaign from 16 August to 2 September. At the start of the campaign, Battery F was assigned to Henry Bohlen's brigade which was part of Carl Schurz's 3rd Division in Franz Sigel's corps. In August, Lieutenant Joseph L. Miller joined Battery F with 50 men and two guns, raising the total number of guns from four to six. The battery fought at the Battle of Sulphur Springs on 24 August. At Freeman's Ford, Schurz sent Bohlen's three regiments across the Rappahannock River, hoping to catch Stonewall Jackson's wagon train. The Federals were suddenly attacked by Isaac R. Trimble's Confederate brigade, which was soon joined by John Bell Hood's two brigades. Bohlen was killed; his troops were routed and chased across the river.

Battery F under Captain Hampton served with Alexander Schimmelfennig's brigade at the Second Battle of Bull Run on 28–30 August 1862. At about 4:00 pm on 29 August, Robert H. Milroy noticed two Confederate brigades launching a flank attack. Spotting Battery F moving from the right flank toward the left, Milroy ordered the first two-gun section to take position south of Groveton Woods. A second section took position at the western edge of the woods. The battery opened fire with canister shot and "we slaughtered them" reported one lieutenant. When the Confederates closed to within 100 yd (91 m), Milroy ordered Hampton to withdraw. In one section, the attackers captured one cannon when too many horses were shot and could not haul it away. In the other section, another gun was lost when its final discharge jammed the handspike into a tree stump. The Confederates used captured Unions soldiers to haul away the two captured guns because no horses were available. The battery fought at the Battle of Chantilly on 1 September.

During the Maryland Campaign, Battery F under Captain Hampton was part of the artillery belonging to Joseph K. Mansfield's XII Corps. At the Battle of Antietam on 17 September, only four of seven of the XII Corps batteries went into action, including Hampton's. The XII Corps batteries reinforced the I Corps batteries north of the Miller cornfield and faced toward the West Woods. These batteries remained in action until the late afternoon. Battery F was armed with four 10-pounder Parrott rifles and its casualties at Antietam were three men wounded. On 22 September, the unit reported a strength of three officers and 76 enlisted men. On 19 September the battery marched to Harper's Ferry and remained there until December. The exceptions were a reconnaissance near Snickersville and Rippon on 8–9 November and another one to Winchester on 2–6 December. The battery moved to Fredericksburg on 12–16 December.

=== 1863–1865 ===
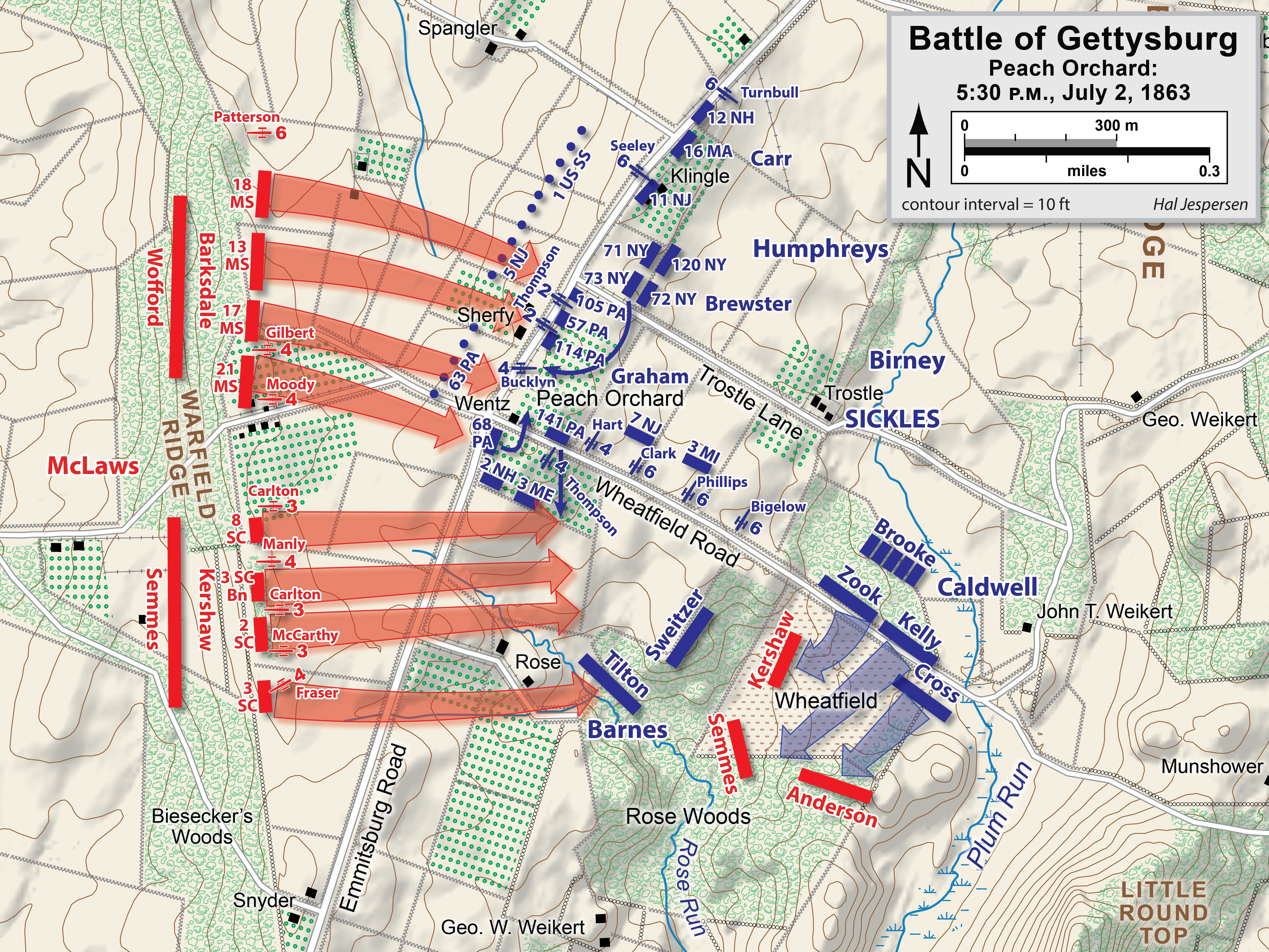
Thompson's battery can be seen north of the Peach Orchard in this 2 July map of the Battle of Gettysburg.

Battery F endured Burnside's Mud March on 20–24 January 1863. Then it remained at Stafford Courthouse until 27 April 27. At the Battle of Chancellorsville on 1–4 May 1863, Battery F was assigned to John W. Geary's 2nd Division in the XII Corps under Henry Warner Slocum. When the XI Corps was routed on 2 May, Army of the Potomac commander Joseph Hooker ordered XII Corps artillery chief Clermont L. Best to form a battery facing west at the Fairview clearing. At twilight, Best had massed 37 artillery pieces from seven different batteries at Fairview. On the morning of 3 May, Battery F with its six Parrott rifles formed part of the gun line at Fairview. Some of the Fairview batteries were protected by earthen revetments, but those at the southern end of the line were not. The southernmost batteries, including Battery F, were only 1,000 yd (914 m) from a powerful Confederate battery at Hazel Grove. During the day's fighting, an enemy shell detonated one of Battery F's caissons and Captain Hampton was mortally wounded in the explosion. Battery F lost two killed and seven wounded at Chancellorsville. Nathaniel Irish was promoted to captain in May.

Battery F participated in the Gettysburg campaign from 11 June to 24 July 1863. At the Battle of Gettysburg on 1–3 July, the unit was converged with Independent Battery C, Pennsylvania Light Artillery under Captain James Thompson. Batteries C and F fought as part of Freeman McGilvery's 1st Volunteer Artillery Brigade in the Army of the Potomac's Artillery Reserve commanded by Robert O. Tyler. On 2 July, Daniel Sickles disobeyed orders by moving his III Corps forward. When the Army of the Potomac's commander George Meade discovered Sickles's mistake, it was too late to do anything but reinforce the thinly-spread III Corps. The Army of the Potomac's artillery chief Henry Jackson Hunt ordered some batteries from his Artillery Reserve to move to the support of Sickles. When Sickles's line finally collapsed from the Confederate attack, the artillery batteries hastily withdrew. Private Casper R. Carlisle of Battery F earned the Medal of Honor for saving one of the battery's guns while under heavy fire. On 3 July, during the Confederate artillery bombardment that preceded George Pickett's charge, Hunt wanted the Reserve Artillery to save their ammunition until the enemy infantry appeared. On the other hand, II Corps commander Winfield Scott Hancock wanted the guns firing to encourage his infantrymen. McGilvery refused Hancock's command to order his brigade to fire, so Hancock tried to persuade the individual battery commanders to do so. Hancock browbeat Thompson into opening fire, which drew Confederate counterbattery fire that caused casualties among McGilvery's heretofore hidden guns. Out of 105 men present in Batteries C and F, the combined unit suffered 28 casualties at Gettysburg. Lieutenant Miller was fatally wounded at Gettysburg, dying five weeks later.

Battery F joined in the Army of the Potomac's advance from the Rappahannock to the Rapidan River on 13–17 September 1863. The unit served in the Bristoe campaign. It was present during the battles of Second Auburn and Bristoe Station on 14 October. The battery moved to the Rappahannock on 7–8 November. Battery F was present during the Battle of Mine Run on 26 November – 2 December. The battery crossed the Rapidan at Germanna Ford and was engaged at Mine Run on 27–28 November and at White Hall Church on 29–30 November. It re-crossed the Rapidan at Gold Mine Ford and went into winter quarters at Brandy Station. The unit fought at the Battle of Morton's Ford on the Rapidan on 6 February 1864. More recruits joined Battery F at this time. The battery marched to Camp Barry where it was re-fitted. It replaced some heavy artillery units in the defenses of Washington, D.C., on 14 May. From May until July, it manned Washington, D.C., defenses south of the Potomac. From July 1864 until April 1865, the battery garrisoned Harper's Ferry. Battery F was reassigned to the defenses of Washington until it was mustered out on 26 June 1865.

== Losses ==
Battery F sustained losses of two officers and eight enlisted men killed and mortally wounded in action, while 14 enlisted men died of disease; there were 24 fatalities.

== See also ==
- List of Pennsylvania Civil War units
- "Original Hampton's Battery F". Hampton's Battery F. Archived from the original on 2019-12-21.
