= George E. Spencer =

American politician (1836–1893)

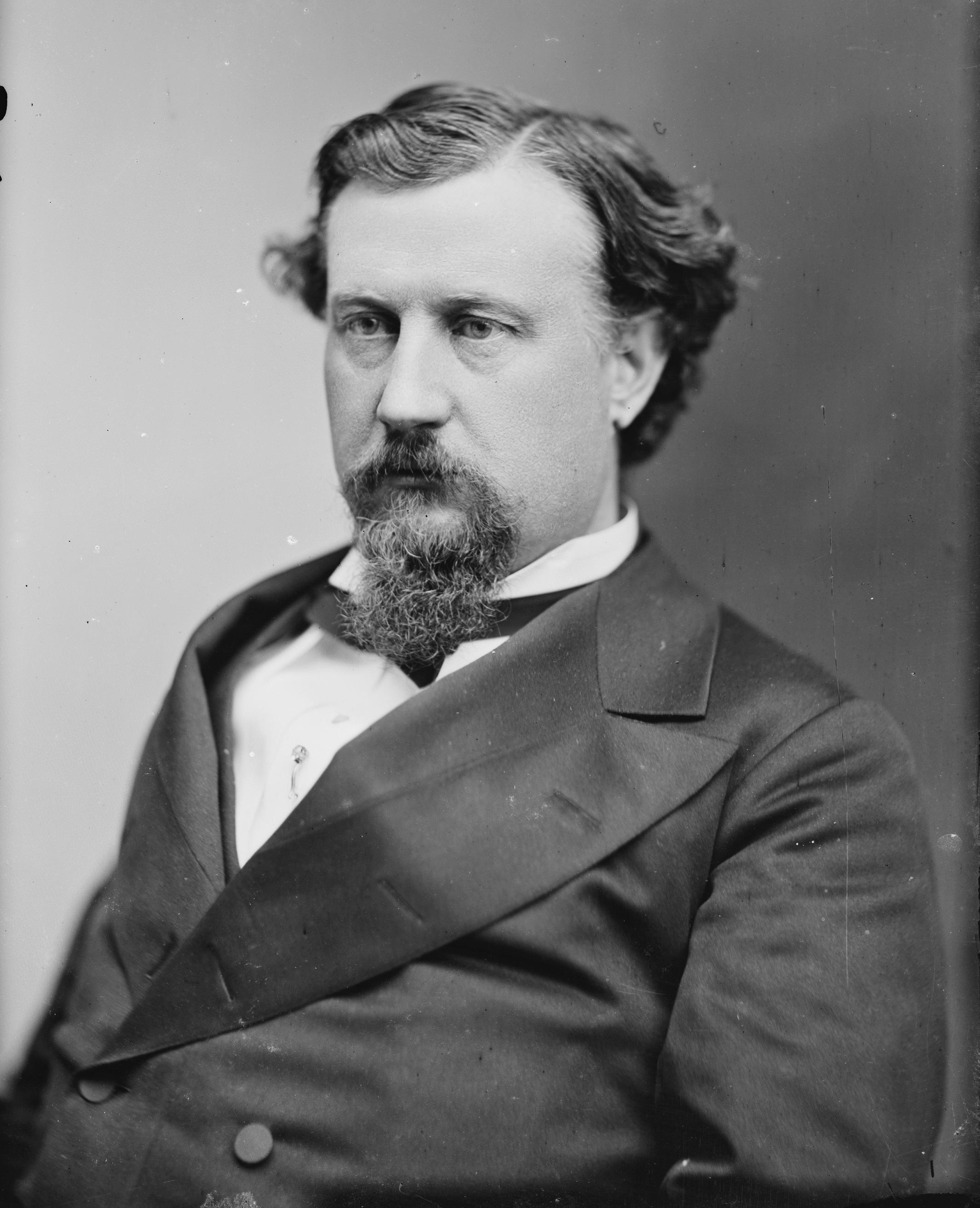

United States Senator from Alabama
- In office July 13, 1868 – March 3, 1879
- Preceded by: Benjamin Fitzpatrick
- Succeeded by: George S. Houston

Personal details
- Born: November 1, 1836 Champion, New York, US
- Died: February 19, 1893 (aged 56) Washington, D.C., US
- Party: Republican
- Spouses: Bella Zilfa (m. 1862; died 1867) May Nunez (m. 1877)
- Profession: Attorney politician rancher miner

Military service
- Allegiance: United States
- Branch/service: Union Army
- Rank: Colonel; Bvt. Brigadier General
- Commands: 1st Alabama Cavalry Regiment
- Battles/wars: American Civil War

George Eliphaz Spencer (November 1, 1836 – February 19, 1893) was an American politician and a U.S. senator from the state of Alabama who also served as an officer in the Union Army during the American Civil War.

== Biography ==
Born in Champion, New York, Spencer was the son of Gordon Percival and Deborah Mallory Spencer. He was educated at Montreal College in Canada. After relocating to Iowa he engaged in the study of law. During the Pike's Peak Gold Rush he briefly relocated to Colorado where in November 1859 he founded the town of Breckenridge and also lived at Golden from 1859-1860. He married English author Bella Zilfa in 1862.

== Career ==
During the American Civil War, Spencer enlisted as a captain on October 16, 1862. While serving on the staff of Brig. Gen. Grenville M. Dodge, he requested a transfer to the 1st Alabama Cavalry Regiment, a volunteer regiment made up of Southern Unionists, which did not have a permanent commander. Receiving a promotion to colonel, he led the regiment from September 11, 1863, until his resignation on July 5, 1865.

After the war, Spencer returned to Alabama to practice law. His wife died of typhoid fever in 1867. For a time he served as register in bankruptcy for the fourth district of Alabama.

Elected as a Republican to the United States Senate upon readmission of Alabama to the Union, Spencer served from July 13, 1868, to March 3, 1879. The Ku Klux Klan and their supporters accused him of corruption and rewarding supporters in the legislature with patronage positions, allegations which he denied.

He was appointed a commissioner of the Union Pacific Railroad with help from his previous leader, Major General Dodge. In 1877, he married prominent actress May Nunez, the niece and namesake of one-armed Confederate General William Wing Loring (May's given names at birth were "William Wing"). The couple then spent two years on a ranch in Nevada tending to mining interests before settling in Washington, D.C., about 1880.

== Death ==
Spencer died in Washington, D.C., on February 19, 1893 (age 56). He is interred at Arlington National Cemetery, Arlington, Virginia.

U.S. Senate
| Preceded by vacant^{1} | U.S. senator (Class 3) from Alabama; 1868–1879; Served alongside: Willard Warner, George Goldthwaite, John T. Morgan | Succeeded by George S. Houston |
Notes and references
1. Because Alabama seceded from the Union in 1861, seat was declared vacant from 1861 to 1868 when Benjamin Fitzpatrick withdrew from the U.S. Senate.
