= Casper R. Carlisle =

American soldier in the American Civil War

- Born: 1841; Allegheny County, Pennsylvania
- Died: April 29, 1908 (aged 66–67); Pennsylvania
- Burial place: Mount Lebanon Cemetery
- Military career
- Allegiance: United States
- Branch: United States Army
- Rank: Private
- Unit: Independent Battery F, Pennsylvania Volunteer Light Artillery - Company F
- Conflicts: Battle of Gettysburg
- Awards: Medal of Honor

Private Casper R. Carlisle (1841 to April 29, 1908) was an American soldier who fought in the American Civil War. Carlisle received the country's highest award for bravery during combat, the Medal of Honor, for his action during the Battle of Gettysburg in Pennsylvania on 2 July 1863. He was honored with the award on 21 December 1892.

== Biography ==
Carlisle was born in Allegheny County, Pennsylvania, in 1841. He enlisted into the Independent Pennsylvania Light Artillery. He died on 29 April 1908 and his remains are interred at the Mount Lebanon Cemetery in Mt. Lebanon, Pennsylvania.

== Medal of Honor citation ==
Saved a gun of his battery under heavy musketry fire, most of the horses being killed and the drivers wounded.

Carlisle earned the Medal at the Peach Orchard.

== See also ==
- List of Medal of Honor recipients for the Battle of Gettysburg
- List of American Civil War Medal of Honor recipients: A–F
