= 110th Pennsylvania Infantry Regiment =

Union Army infantry regiment

110th Pennsylvania Volunteer Infantry
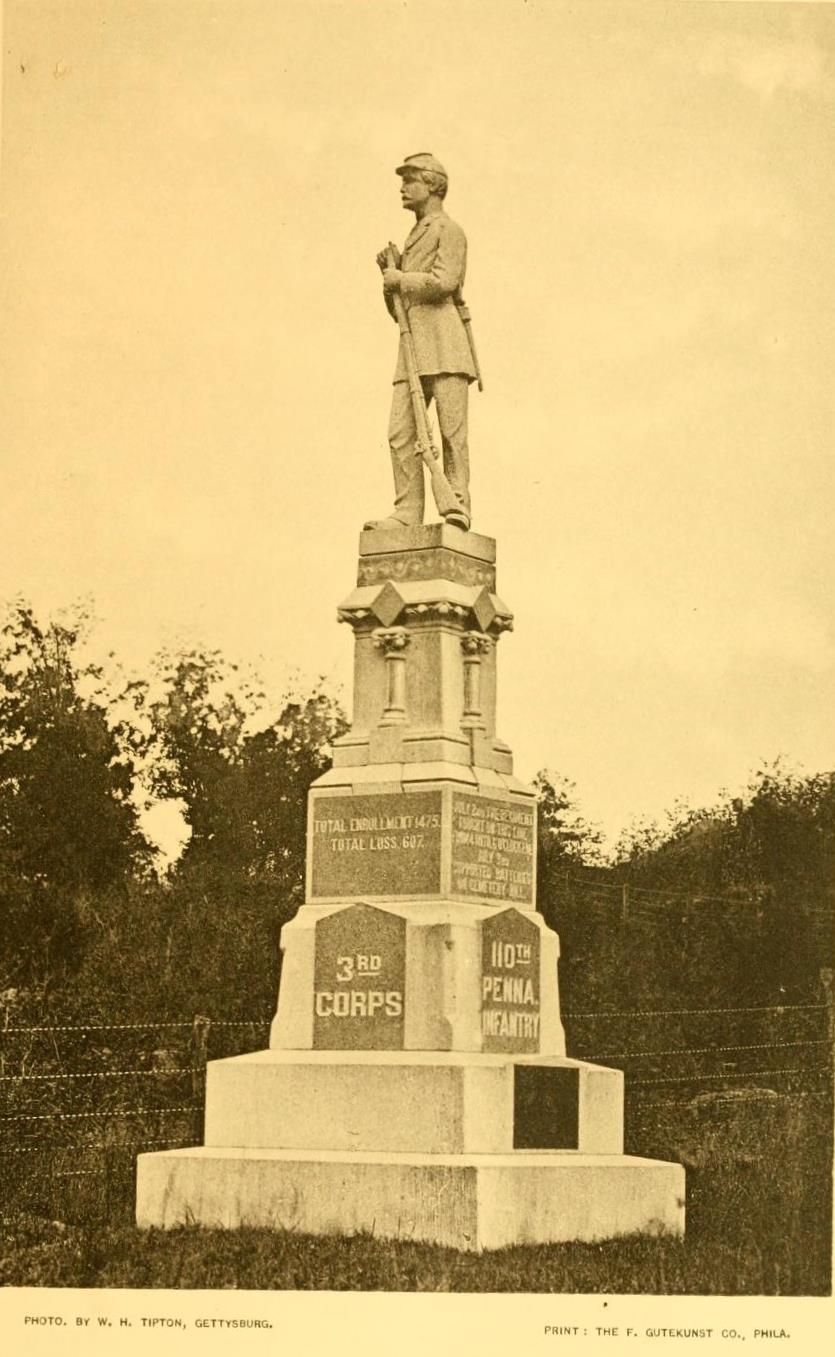
- 110th Pennsylvania Infantry Monument Gettysburg, PA
- Active: August 19, 1861, to June 28, 1865
- Country: United States
- Allegiance: Union
- Branch: Infantry
- Engagements: First Battle of Kernstown; Battle of Port Republic; Battle of Cedar Mountain; Second Battle of Bull Run; Battle of Fredericksburg; Battle of Chancellorsville; Battle of Gettysburg (6 companies); Battle of Wapping Heights; Bristoe Campaign; First Battle of Auburn; Second Battle of Rappahannock Station; Mine Run Campaign; Battle of Mine Run; Battle of the Wilderness; Battle of Spotsylvania Court House; Battle of Cold Harbor; Siege of Petersburg; First Battle of Deep Bottom; Second Battle of Deep Bottom; Battle of Peebles' Farm; Battle of Boydton Plank Road; Battle of Hatcher's Run; Appomattox Campaign; Battle of Sailor's Creek; Battle of Appomattox

The 110th Pennsylvania Volunteer Infantry was an infantry regiment that served in the Union Army during the American Civil War.

== Service ==
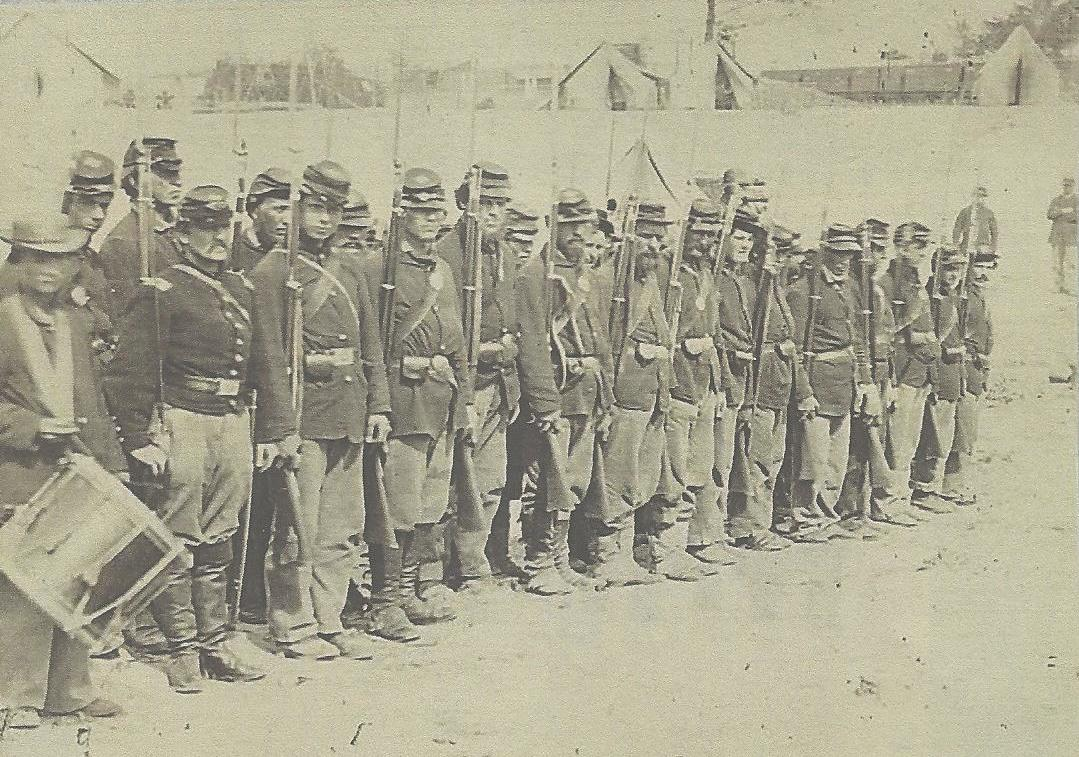
Co C, 110th Pennsylvania Infantry after the Battle of Fredericksburg, April 24, 1863

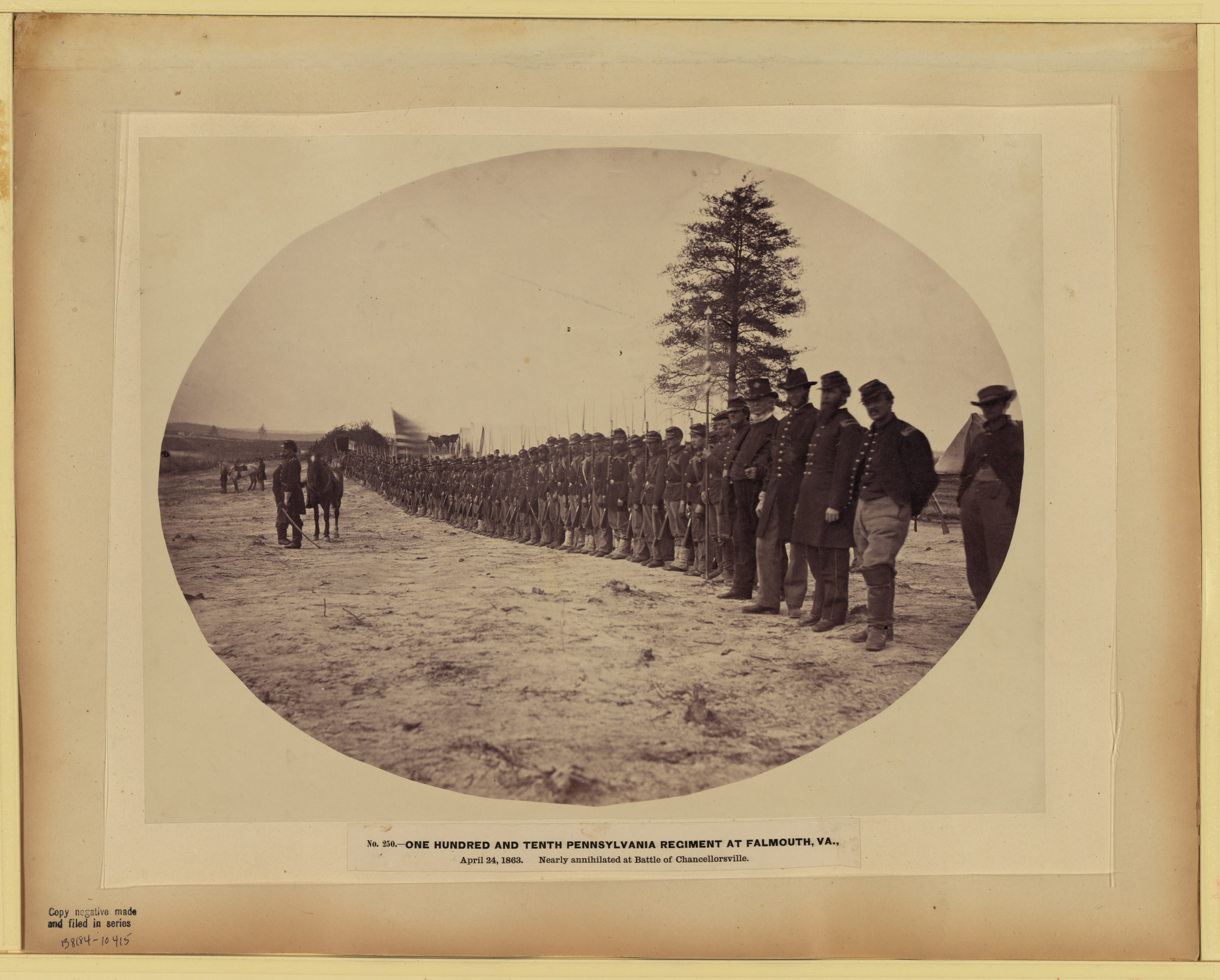
One hundred and tenth Pennsylvania regiment at Falmouth, Va., April 24, 1863, nearly annihilated at battle of Chancellorsville

The 110th Pennsylvania Infantry was organized at Harrisburg, Huntingdon, and Philadelphia, Pennsylvania, and mustered in on August 19, 1861, for three years service under the command of Colonel William Delaware Lewis Jr.

The regiment comprised four companies from urban Philadelphia and six from rural counties in western Pennsylvania. Despite the fact that most of the regiment hailed from western counties, all of its regimental officers and color guard were Philadelphians. Regional resentments turned violent in Hagerstown, Maryland on January 3, 1862, when a drunken brawl over control of the regimental colors. As the men had not yet been issued firearms, they took to assaulting each other with goose-egg sized limestone chunks broken off the freshly macadamized National Turnpike. The fight was broken up by the 1st Maryland Cavalry, but not before three men had been killed and more than forty wounded—several mortally.

The regiment participated in the defense of the lower Shenandoah Valley during the Romney Expedition in January 1862. The regiment was attached to Tyler's Brigade, Landers' Division, Army of the Potomac, to March 1862. 3rd Brigade, Shield's 2nd Division, Banks' V Corps and Department of the Shenandoah, to May 1862. 4th Brigade, Shield's Division, Department of the Rappahannock, to June 1862. 4th Brigade, 2nd Division, III Corps, Army of Virginia, to September 1862. 2nd Brigade, 3rd Division, III Corps, Army of the Potomac, to June 1863. 3rd Brigade, 1st Division, III Corps, to March 1864. 1st Brigade, 3rd Division, II Corps, to June, 1865.

The 110th Pennsylvania Infantry mustered out June 28, 1865.

== Detailed service ==
Left Pennsylvania for Hancock, Md., January 2, 1862. Defense of Hancock January 5. At Cumberland and south branch of the Potomac guarding bridges of the Baltimore & Ohio Railroad until February 6. Moved to Paw Paw Tunnel and duty there until March 7, 1862. Advance on Winchester March 7–15. Reconnaissance to Strasburg March 18–21. Battle of First Kernstown March 23. Pursuit of Jackson up the Valley March 24-April 27. Occupation of Mt. Jackson April 17. March to Fredericksburg May 12–21, and to Front Royal May 25–30. Near Front Royal May 31. Port Republic June 9. Battle of Cedar Mountain August 9. Pope's Campaign in northern Virginia August 16-September 2. Fords of the Rappahannock August 21–23. Manassas August 23. Thoroughfare Gap August 28. Groveton August 29. Bull Run August 30. Duty at Arlington Heights, Defenses of Washington, Whipple's Command, until October. Moved to Pleasant Valley October 18, then to Warrenton and Falmouth, Va., October 24-November 19. Battle of Fredericksburg December 12–15. Burnside's 2nd Campaign, "Mud March," January 20–24, 1863. At Falmouth until April. Chancellorsville Campaign April 27-May 6. Battle of Chancellorsville May 1–5. Gettysburg Campaign June 11-July 24. Battle of Gettysburg July 1–3. Pursuit of Lee July 5–24. Wapping Heights, Va., July 23. On line of the Rappahannock until October. Bristoe Campaign October 9–22. Auburn and Bristoe October 13–14. Advance to line of the Rappahannock November 7–8. Kelly's Ford November 7. Mine Run Campaign November 26-December 2. Payne's Farm November 27. Demonstration on the Rapidan February 6–7, 1864. Duty near Brandy Station until May. Rapidan Campaign May 4-June 12. Battles of the Wilderness May 5–7. Laurel Hill May 8. Spotsylvania May 8–12. Po River May 10. Spotsylvania Court House May 12–21. Assault on the Salient May 12. Harris Farm May 19. North Anna River May 23–26. On line of the Pamunkey May 26–28. Totopotomoy May 28–31. Cold Harbor June 1–12. Before Petersburg June 16–18. Siege of Petersburg June 16, 1864, to April 2, 1865. Jerusalem Plank Road June 22–23, 1864. Demonstration north of the James at Deep Bottom July 27–29. Deep Bottom July 27–28. Mine Explosion, Petersburg, July 30 (reserve). Demonstration north of the James at Deep Bottom August 13–20. Strawberry Plains, Deep Bottom, August 14–18. Poplar Springs Church September 29-October 2. Boydton Plank Road, Hatcher's Run, October 27–28. Warren's Raid on Hicksford December 7–12. Dabney's Mills, Hatcher's Run, February 5–7, 1865. Watkins' House March 25. Appomattox Campaign March 28-April 9. White Oak Road March 30–31. Crow's House March 31. Fall of Petersburg April 2. Sailor's Creek April 6. High Bridge, Farmville, April 7. Appomattox Court House April 9. Surrender of Lee and his army. At Burkesville until May 2. March to Washington, D.C., May 2–12. Grand Review of the Armies May 23.

== Casualties ==
The regiment lost a total of 196 men during service; 7 officers and 111 enlisted men killed or mortally wounded, 78 enlisted men died of disease.

== Commanders ==
- Colonel William Delaware Lewis Jr.
- Colonel James Crowther - commanded at the Battle of Fredericksburg while at the rank of lieutenant colonel; promoted and killed in action at the Battle of Chancellorsville
- Lieutenant Colonel David M. Jones - commanded at the Battle of Fredericksburg while at the rank of major after Col Crowther was killed in action (wounded and captured during the battle); commanded at the Battle of Gettysburg until wounded in action, July 2
- Major Isaac Rodgers - commanded at the Battle of Gettysburg after Ltc Jones was wounded
- Major Levi B. Duff - commanded during the Mine Run Campaign

== See also ==
- List of Pennsylvania Civil War Units
- Pennsylvania in the Civil War
