= Bella Zilfa Spencer =

English-born American novelist and editor

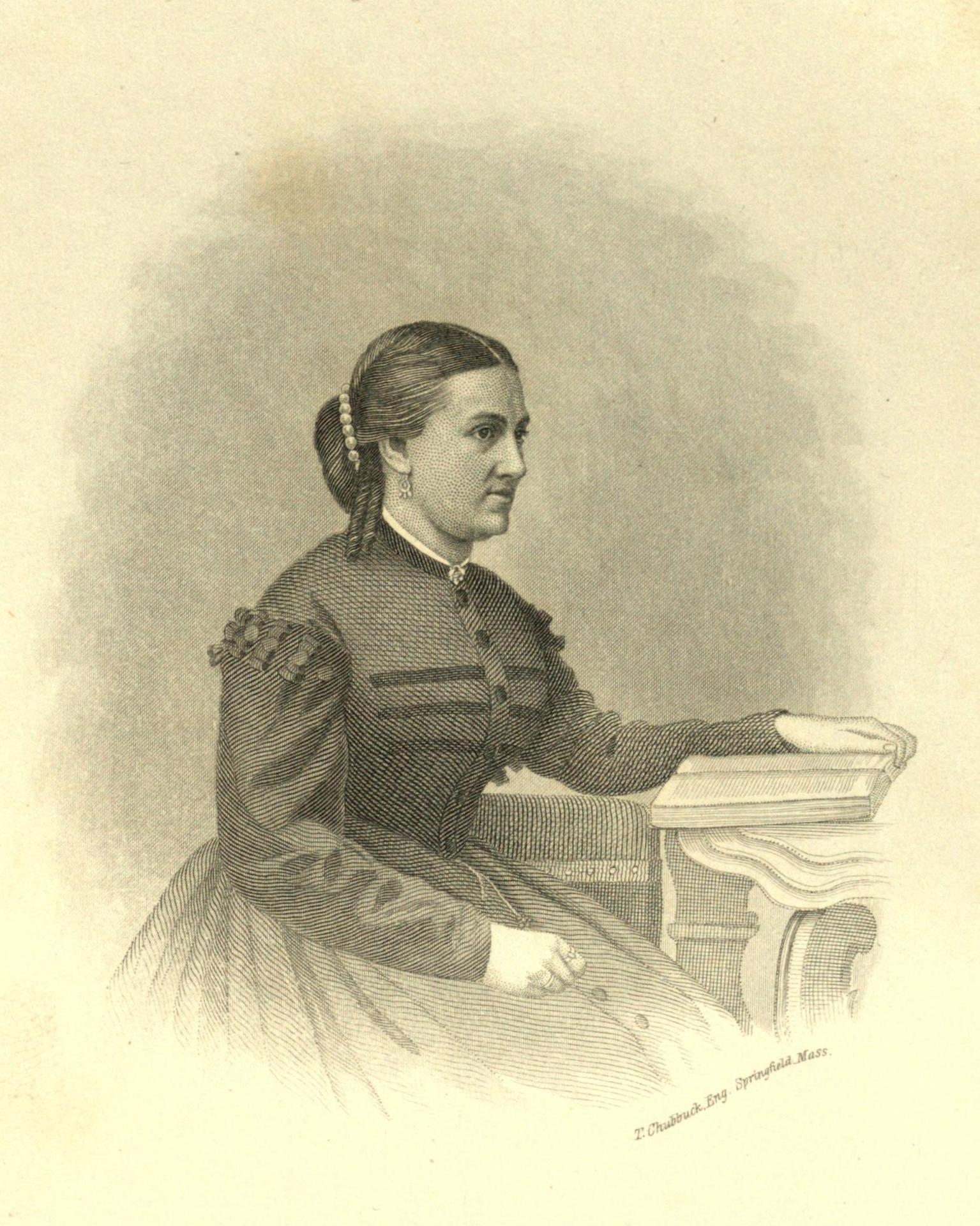
- Born: March 1, 1840; London
- Died: August 1, 1867 (aged 27); Tuscaloosa
- Occupation: Writer
- Spouse(s): George E. Spencer

Bella Zilfa Spencer (March 1, 1840 – August 1, 1867) was an English-born American novelist and early editor of the Saturday Evening Post, She was the first wife of future US Senator George Eliphaz Spencer.

Bella Zilfa Spencer was born on March 1, 1840 in London. According to an account of her life published in 1867 she was the daughter of an English man, the second son of a Sir Edward St. Alban, and an Italian mother. The family settled in West Virginia, where she was orphaned and raised by a foster family. She married at the age of 15, but by 1860 her husband and two children were dead.

She published numerous short stories in magazines like Godey's Lady's Book and Harper's Magazine and several novels and collections of stories. She was an editor of the Saturday Evening Post in Philadelphia and later purchased a share of the ownership.

In 1862, she married George E. Spencer. George Spencer was a Union Army General during the American Civil War. Following the war, he practiced law in Alabama before becoming a politician there. Bella Spencer died in Tuscaloosa, Alabama on 1 August 1867.

== Bibliography ==
- Ora, the Lost Wife (1864)
- Tried and True, A Story of the Rebellion (1866)
- Surface and Depth (1867)
