= Mace, West Virginia =

- Unincorporated community
- Location within West Virginia Location within the United States
- Coordinates: 38°27′22″N 80°01′50″W
- Country: United States
- State: West Virginia
- County: Pocahontas
- Elevation: 3,396 ft (1,035 m)
- Time zone: UTC-5 (Eastern (EST))
  - Summer (DST): UTC-4 (EDT)
- Area codes: 304 & 681
- GNIS feature ID: 1555021

Mace is an unincorporated community in Pocahontas County, West Virginia, United States. Mace is located on U.S. Route 219 and West Virginia Route 55, 16.5 miles (26.6 km) north-northeast of Marlinton.

The community has the name of the local Mace family.
