= May Nunez =

American author and actress

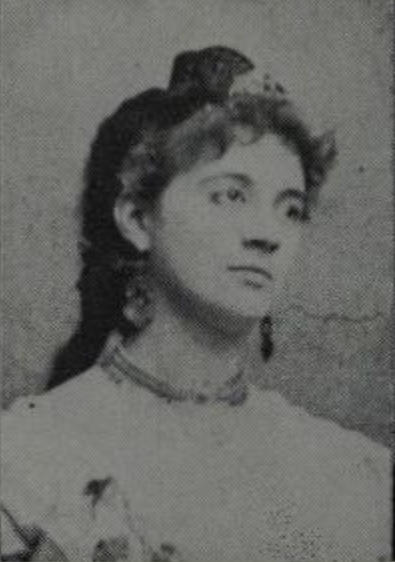
May Nunez (1875)

William "May" Loring Spencer (née Nunez; October 1, 1847 – May 13, 1921) was an American author and stage actress.

== Family origins ==
May Nunez was born in St. Augustine, Florida, on October 1, 1847. Her mother, Eliza Loring, was on her mother's side descended from a North Carolinian family, which claimed descent from lords sitting in the Irish Parliament. Her father was of the Boston family of Lorings, descendants of Thomas Loring. Her mother, who was esteemed a beauty, was the sister of general William Wing Loring, of the Khedive's army. The daughter was named William Wing after this uncle, who was then a major in the United States army. As a child she was called "the little Major", which as she grew older was abbreviated to May, and as May she was known to her friends. Her father, Albert A. Nunez, was descended from the noble Castilian family of Nunez that in the 19th century still held its rank in the court of Spain. Gonsalvo de Nunez was of the same family, also the Admiral de Nunez who died off the South American coast.

== Early life ==
In his youth Albert Nunez had been in California the law partner of Gregory Yale, but soon after May's birth he moved the family to Baltimore, Maryland, in which city May and her sister lived as children. There her father was the law partner of Judge Collins Lee, of the same family as Robert E. Lee, and her young mother was one of the most admired of Baltimore's elite. It was in Baltimore that May's mother became a Roman Catholic, and from Baltimore she and her sister were sent to Mount De Sales Convent to be educated in the religion as well as the branches necessary to a girl whose future promised prosperity. From Baltimore Albert Nunez moved to New York, where his wife died.

== Travels in Europe ==
In New York reverses of fortune fell upon Albert Nunez. General Loring wrote for his nieces to go to Europe. He desired that they should continue their studies of music and the languages, and stood towards them, the only children of his only sister, as guardian and protector. After leaving their friends in England and France, they travelled over some of the wildest parts of Italy. General Loring being detained in Egypt by state affairs, they were in Italy a year before he joined them and took them on a tour through the country, and obtained for them a private audience with the Pope at Rome.

After many months, General Loring was recalled to Egypt, leaving his nieces in Milan to continue their studies, and expecting them to winter at his palace in Alexandria. But they did not visit Egypt, for a telegram came from New York informing them that their father was paralyzed. Arrived in New York, they found he was helpless for life and had lost every dollar, and they were compelled to find work. A friend obtained for May, the younger daughter, a clerkship in the New York Post-Office. She received $85 per month, but it was not enough to cover her father's expenses.

== Theatrical career ==
When the Murray Hill Dramatic Association, to which May belonged, cast her for Lady Gay Spanker, and she played Desdemona to a lawyer's Othello, Augustin Daly offered her a position in his theatre company, which she accepted. She travelled in the South with his company for a season, playing opposite parts to Sara Jewett.

From the tour Daly sent her to Boston, where she played a small part in Pique, until one night, Miss Davenport being ill, the manuscript of her part, Mabel Renfrew, was given to May to perfect. She had never seen the play, except the few scenes when she was on the stage. She was to take the part before a Boston audience, with only one rehearsal on a darkened stage. Her performance was accounted a success, and Daly afterwards gave her leading parts. In New York, he sent the wing of the army to which May belonged to play at the Grand Opera House, which, until then, had not been popular. They opened in Under the Gaslight, and made a hit. May soon became a favorite attraction. She went next to the Bowery with some members of Daly's company.

== Marriage and death ==
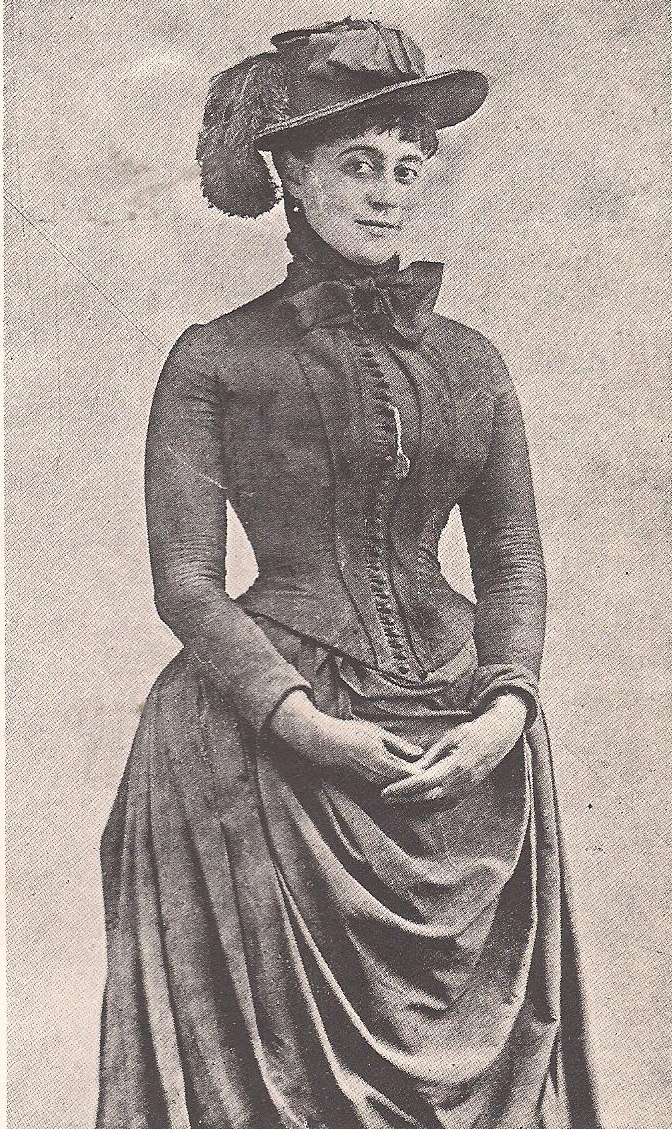
Photographic portrait from Calamity Jane: A Story of the Back Hills (1887)

From the Bowery Theatre, May was sent to Washington, D.C. There she met George E. Spencer, a Senator from Alabama, who was many years her senior. They fell in love, and in 1877 she became his second wife: they were married early one morning in a Roman Catholic chapel on 14th Street, New York City.

After her marriage, May left the stage. When her husband went out to Nevada to look after his mining interests, May went with him, and when other business called him away she stayed and looked after his interests in Deadwood, Dakota Territory. It was from the experiences there that she gathered the material for her novel A Plucky One. The couple spent two years on their ranch in Nevada before settling in Washington, about 1880. There George Spencer died on February 19, 1893. May died on May 23, 1921, aged seventy-three.

== Works ==
1. Salt Lake Fruit (1883);
2. Story of Mary (1884), republished as Dennis Day (1887);
3. A Plucky One (1887);
4. Calamity Jane: A Story of the Back Hills (1887).

== Bibliography ==
- Ayres, H. M., ed. (1917). "William Loring Nunez Spencer". In The Reader's Dictionary of Authors. New York, NY: Warner Library.
- Blum, Daniel; Willis, John (1960). A Pictorial History of the American Theatre 1860–1970. 3rd ed. New York, NY: Crown Publishers, Inc.
- Kaemmerlen, Cathy J. (2006). General Sherman and the Georgia Belles: Tales of Women Left Behind. Charleston, SC: The History Press.
- Watson, Elbert L. (2010). "George Spencer". In Encyclopedia of Alabama. Alabama Humanities Alliance. Auburn University Outreach.
- "A Plucky One. From the Boston Record". (July 1887). In Leypoldt, Frederick (ed.). The Literary News 8(7). New York, NY.
