= William Wing Loring =

American soldier (1818–1886)

William W. Loring
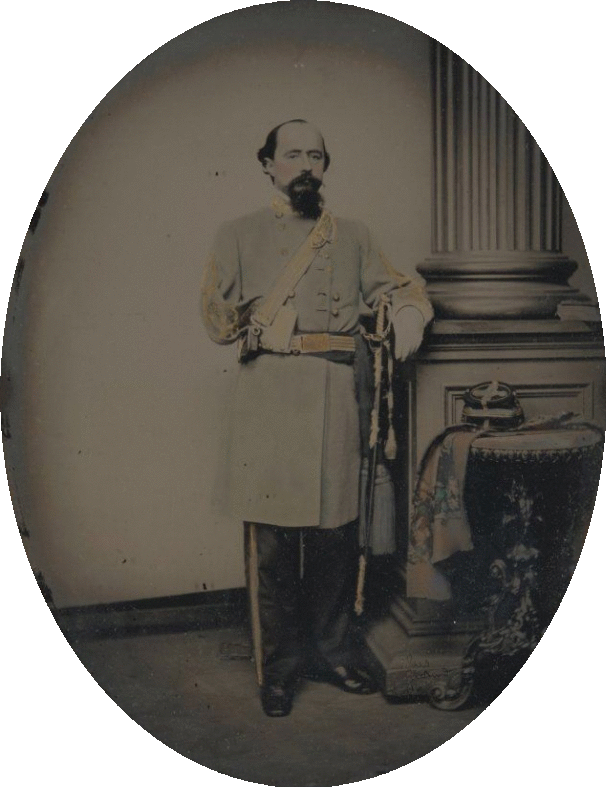
- Ambrotype of Loring in Confederate uniform, 1862

Member of the Florida House of Representatives
- In office 1843–1845

Personal details
- Born: December 4, 1818 Wilmington, North Carolina
- Died: December 30, 1886 (aged 68) New York City, New York
- Nickname: "Old Blizzards"

Military service
- Allegiance: United States; Confederate States; Khedivate of Egypt
- Branch/service: United States Army; Confederate States Army; Egyptian Army
- Years of service: 1846–1861 (USA); 1861–1865 (CSA); 1869–1878 (Egypt)
- Rank: Colonel (USA); Major General (CSA); Pasha (Egypt)
- Commands: Regiment of Mounted Riflemen (USA); Army of the Northwest (CSA)
- Battles/wars: Second Seminole War; Mexican-American War; Battle of Cerro Gordo; Battle of Contreras; Battle of Churubusco; Battle of Molino del Rey; Battle of Chapultepec (WIA); American Civil War; Western Virginia Campaign; Vicksburg Campaign; Battle of Champion Hill; Siege of Jackson; Battle of Resaca; Battle of New Hope Church; Battle of Kennesaw Mountain; Battle of Peachtree Creek; Battle of Ezra Church; Battle of Lovejoy's Station; Battle of Franklin II; Battle of Nashville; Carolinas campaign; Ethiopian–Egyptian War; Battle of Gura

William Wing Loring (December 4, 1818 – December 30, 1886) was an American soldier, politician, and lawyer. His military career spanned fifty years and saw him serve in the armies of the United States, the Confederate States, and the Khedivate of Egypt.

He was a veteran of the Mexican-American War and was one of the youngest colonels in the U.S. Army at the time before resigning his commission to serve in the Confederate Army during the Civil War. Loring, along with other Civil War veterans, travelled to Egypt in an effort to modernize the country's military where he was given the rank of Fereek Pasha (Major General).

== Early life ==
William was born in Wilmington, North Carolina to Reuben Loring and Hannah Kenan Loring. His mother was from a prominent North Carolina family and through his father, he was a fifth great-grandson of Plymouth Colony pioneer Deacon Thomas Loring. When he was four, his family moved to Saint Augustine, Florida. Here, his father worked as a builder, constructing a sugar mill in the territory and later owned an orange plantation.

At fourteen years old, Loring joined the Florida Militia and gained his first combat experience fighting against the Seminole Indians in minor skirmishes that would culminate in the Second Seminole War. When he was seventeen, he ran away to fight in the Texas War for Independence, but was soon retrieved by his father and taken home. For the next few years, he continued to fight in the Seminole War and was promoted to second lieutenant by the time he was seventeen. In 1837, Loring was sent to Alexandria Boarding School in Alexandria, Virginia, completing his secondary education. He then attended Georgetown University from 1839 to 1840 before returning to Florida. He worked in the law office of territorial representative and future senator David Levy Yulee, continued to study law, and was admitted to the Florida bar in 1842. He began practicing law and in 1843, he was elected to the Florida House of Representatives where he served until 1845. In 1845, the year Florida was admitted into the Union as a state, he ran unsuccessfully for the Florida Senate.

== Military career ==
=== Mexican-American War ===
In 1846, Loring joined a newly formed regiment, the Regiment of Mounted Rifles, originally created to protect the Oregon Territory. He was promoted to major even before the regiment saw battle. Shortly thereafter the Mounted Rifles were sent to Mexico to fight in the Mexican-American War. Loring's regiment saw action in most of the battles of the war and he was wounded three times. While leading the charge into Mexico City, Loring's arm was shattered by a Mexican bullet, and he later had it amputated. He received two brevets for bravery, one to lieutenant colonel, and another to colonel.

=== Antebellum years ===
In 1849, during the California gold rush, Loring was ordered to take command of the Oregon Territory and led a train of 600 mule teams 2,500 miles from Missouri to Oregon. He was in command of the Oregon Territory for two years and was then transferred to being commander of the forts of the frontier, such as Fort Ewell, Fort McIntosh, and Fort Union. During some five years he engaged in many skirmishes with the Indians, most notably with the Comanches, Apaches, and Kiowas. Loring was promoted to colonel at the age of 38 in December 1856, the youngest in the army.

He left the United States and traveled to Europe in May 1859. While there, he, like many of his fellow American officers, studied the military tactics that had been invented in the recent Crimean War. Before he returned home, Loring would visit Great Britain, France, Sweden, Prussia, Switzerland, Austria-Hungary, Italy, Russia, Turkey, and Egypt.

=== Civil War ===
When the Civil War erupted, Loring sided with the South. In a conference in New Mexico, before departing for Confederate service, Loring told his officers, "The South is my home, and I am going to throw up my commission and shall join the Southern Army, and each of you can do as you think best." He resigned from the U.S. Army on May 13, 1861. Upon offering his services to the Confederacy, Loring was promptly commissioned a brigadier general and given command of the Army of the Northwest, participating in the Western Virginia Campaign in the fall of 1861. His first assignment was to quickly collect and rally the shattered remnants of Robert S. Garnett's force following its defeat at the Battle of Rich Mountain, and drill them in preparation for the defense of western Virginia against Maj. Gen. George B. McClellan's invasion from Ohio.

After organizing an army of roughly 11,700 at Monterey, Virginia, Loring detached two brigades under Henry R. Jackson and William B. Taliaferro to the north, to fortify Frank Mountain, and defend the approach from Cheat Mountain. Loring moved the rest of his army, the brigades of S.R. Anderson, Daniel S. Donelson, and William Gilham, south to Huntersville. Four days after he arrived at Huntersville, Loring was joined by Colonel Robert E. Lee, who had been sent by Richmond to western Virginia with the diplomatic role of inspecting and consulting. Loring, a Mexican War veteran who outranked Lee at the time, saw Lee as Richmond's attempt to look over his shoulder and grew resentful of his presence. Loring and Lee moved the southern portion of their army to Valley Mountain, near Mace, and down the Tygart Valley to the Battle of Cheat Mountain in September 1861. Loring soon acquired the nickname, "Old Blizzards" for his battle cry, "Give them blizzards, boys! Give them blizzards!" Following that debacle, they moved south into Greenbrier County to reinforce the troops of the Kanawha Division under former Virginia governors John B. Floyd and Henry Alexander Wise, then at Sewell Mountain and Meadow Bluff. Lee was recalled to Richmond in late October. Loring and the men remained for a short period before abandoning the mountainous region too, marching into, and down the Shenandoah Valley to join Stonewall Jackson at Winchester.

Loring famously butted heads with superior officers, particularly with Stonewall Jackson. At the conclusion of the Romney Expedition in northwestern Virginia (now West Virginia) in January 1862, Jackson returned to his headquarters in Winchester while assigning Loring to stay and occupy the small, mountainous town. Unhappy with their assignment of holding a remote outpost in the dead of winter, Loring and his officers went over Jackson's head to Secretary of War Judah P. Benjamin, requesting that the division be withdrawn. Jackson complied with the order, then resigned in protest of Richmond's interference with his command. He withdrew his resignation at the urging of Governor John Letcher and his commander, Joseph E. Johnston. Loring was reassigned out of Jackson's command and given command of the Department of Southwestern Virginia. In his five months in that role, Loring moved a force of 5,000 into the Kanawha Valley in his Kanawha Valley Campaign of 1862, ultimately occupying Charleston for six weeks. In mid-October, Loring was transferred to the West.

By November 1862, Loring was in Grenada, Mississippi, commanding a division in John C. Pemberton's Department of Mississippi and East Louisiana, another superior officer with whom he had friction. In early spring of 1863, he defended against the Yazoo Pass Expedition, before his division was ordered south to reinforce Vicksburg. He was present at Pemberton's disastrous defeat at Champion Hill where he initially disobeyed an order from Pemberton to advance. Cut off from the rest of the army, most of his division then marched east to Jackson, Mississippi to join forces with Gen. Joseph E. Johnston for the impending siege. A feud between Loring and Pemberton over these actions persisted long after the war had ended.

By the end of 1863, he was under the command of Lt. Gen. Leonidas Polk and defended east Mississippi from William T. Sherman during the Meridian Campaign of February 1864. Polk's relatively small force was then ordered to northwest Georgia to join Joe Johnston's Army of Tennessee, which was beginning to abandon its winter quarters in Dalton, Georgia to start the Atlanta campaign. Polk's divisions, one commanded by Loring, arrived just in time to temporarily thwart a flanking maneuver by Union General James B. McPherson at the Battle of Resaca. Facing overwhelming numbers, Johnston's army was continuously flanked and forced to withdraw closer and closer to Atlanta.

Loring temporarily took command of Polk's III Corps when Polk was nearly cut in two by an artillery round and killed at Pine Mountain on June 14, 1864. He led the corps during the Battle of Kennesaw Mountain but was soon replaced on July 7, 1864, by Lt. Gen. Alexander P. Stewart. Loring returned to divisional command, fighting at the Battle of Peachtree Creek, and at Ezra Church, where he was wounded. Loring was out of action until after the fall of Atlanta. Upon returning he commanded his division in Stewart's corps of army now commanded by John Bell Hood, seeing combat at Franklin on November 30, 1864, and Nashville in mid-December. In the last year of the war, the remnants of Hood's smashed forces returned east to participate in the Carolinas campaign, seeing action at the Battle of Bentonville before being surrendered by Johnston at Durham, North Carolina a month later.

=== Egypt ===
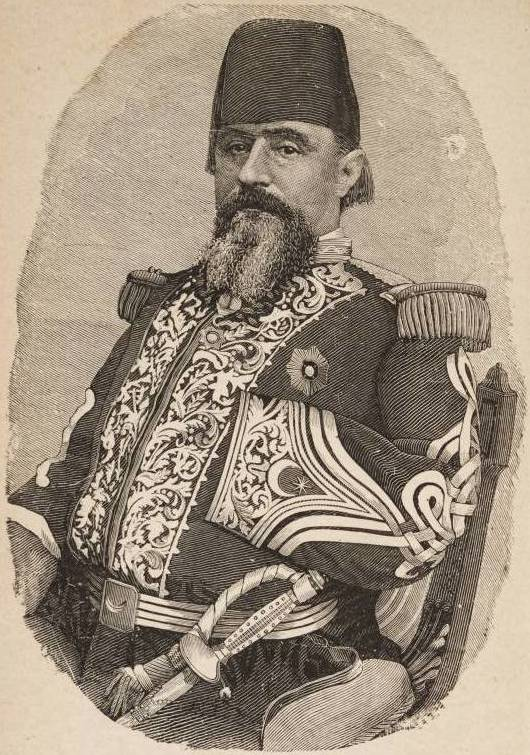
Loring Pasha as a general in the Khedivate of Egypt

After the Confederate defeat in the Civil War, Loring served for nine years in the army of Isma'il Pasha, the Khedive of Egypt. He joined about fifty Union and Confederate veterans who had been recommended to the Khedive by William Tecumseh Sherman. Loring began as Inspector General of the Army, a position in which he suggested various ways to modernize the Army. He was then placed in charge of the country's coastal defenses, where he oversaw the erection of numerous fortifications. In 1875, he was promised the command of an Egyptian invasion of Abyssinia, Ratib Pasha was given the assignment instead, and Loring was named chief of staff. Ratib Pasha was the ex-slave of the late Said Pawshar, the viceroy of Egypt, with negligible military qualifications; according to one of Loring's American compatriots, the freedman was "shrivelled with lechery as the mummy is with age." The Egyptian-Ethiopian War ended in disaster at the Battle of Gura, and the Egyptians blamed the Americans for the disaster. When Ratib Pasha had urged remaining with the Gura fortress, Loring had taunted him and called him a coward until he consented to meeting the Ethiopian host in the open valley. While the rest of the Egyptian army returned home, they were ordered to remain in Massawa until further notice, where they endured the summer months, then spent the next two years enduring endless frustration and humiliation in Cairo. In 1878, partially due to finances, the American officers were dismissed. During his service to Egypt, Loring attained the rank of Fereek Pasha (Major General). After his return to the United States, he wrote a book about his Egyptian experiences, entitled A Confederate Soldier in Egypt (1884). Loring was also the posthumous co-author of The March of the Mounted Riflemen (1940).

== Later life ==
Loring returned to Florida where he unsuccessfully ran for the United States Senate against Charles W. Jones. He then moved to New York City, where he died of pneumonia. He was buried in Loring Park, behind Government House in downtown St. Augustine, Florida until August 24, 2020, when the University of Florida Historic St. Augustine exhumed his ashes and began the process of moving them to Craig Funeral Home Memorial Park.

== Legacy and honors ==
- During World War II the Liberty ship SS William W. Loring was built in Panama City, Florida, and named in his honor.
- A memorial to him in St. Augustine, Florida, was removed in August 2020 at the request of his descendants.
- Actress May Nunez (1847–1921), a niece, was named William Wing Nunez at birth in his honor
