= Confederate Army of the Northwest =

Army of the Northwest
- Active: June 8, 1861–February 9, 1862
- Disbanded: Incorporated into Army of Northern Virginia February 9, 1862
- Country: Confederate States of America
- Branch: Confederate States Army
- Engagements: Battle of Rich Mountain; Battle of Corrick's Ford; Battle of Cheat Mountain

Commanders
- Notable commanders: Robert S. Garnett †; Henry R. Jackson; William W. Loring; Edward Johnson

The Army of the Northwest was a Confederate army early in the American Civil War.

On June 8, 1861, Confederate troops operating in northwestern Virginia were designated the "Army of the Northwest" with Brig. Gen. Robert S. Garnett as commanding general. Troops of this command were engaged by Maj. Gen. George B. McClellan's Department of the Ohio forces in a series of battles and skirmishes early in summer 1861. Garnett's army was defeated at Battle of Rich Mountain, and pursuing Union troops killed Garnett at Corrick's Ford July 13, 1861.

After Garnett's death, Brig. Gen. Henry R. Jackson briefly commanded the force, but Brig. Gen. William W. Loring arrived to take charge on July 20. Loring commanded until November, when he was given three Army of the Northwest brigades as a division (still designated Army of the Northwest) paired with the Stonewall Brigade under Stonewall Jackson's command for the Romney Expedition. The army was disbanded February 9, 1862, but a separate small force under Brig. Gen. Edward Johnson which operated in the northern Shenandoah Valley became known as the "Army of the Northwest" and after involvement in the Battle of Camp Allegheny was styled the "Army of the Allegheny". Johnson acquired his sobriquet "Allegheny" in command of this force.

== See also ==
West Virginia Civil War Confederate Units
