= Romney Expedition =

Early maneuver of the Confederate Army in the US Civil War

The Romney Expedition was a military expedition of the Confederate States Army during the early part of the American Civil War. It is named for Romney, West Virginia, which at the time was still in the state of Virginia. The expedition was conducted in this locale from January 1 to January 24, 1862, as part of the preliminary actions of Stonewall Jackson's Valley Campaign. Confederate forces under Major General Thomas J. "Stonewall" Jackson cleared Union forces under Major General Nathaniel Banks and Brigadier General William S. Rosecrans from the lower Shenandoah Valley and surrounding Allegheny ranges, and then successfully severed the Baltimore and Ohio Railroad and the Chesapeake and Ohio Canal.

== Background ==
Major General Jackson, newly promoted on October 7, 1861, was given command of the newly formed Valley District of the Department of Northern Virginia on October 22. He arrived to establish his command headquarters at Winchester, Virginia, on November 4. Upon his arrival, he requested command of all forces in the Valley and along the Allegheny ridges south of Winchester, formerly under General Robert E. Lee. He was given his old Stonewall Brigade and Brigadier General William W. Loring's Division, which were not fully assembled until Christmas 1861. In the meantime, Jackson assembled all local cavalry forces into a new regiment under the command of Colonel Turner Ashby, and then used Ashby's force to conduct raids destroying sections of the Chesapeake and Ohio Canal.

Jackson soon conceived a grand scheme to retake control of western Virginia (later the state of West Virginia) by conducting a large expedition along the Potomac River valley along the northern boundary of Virginia.

On the 20th of November, 1861, he wrote to the War Department, proposing an expedition to Romney, in western Virginia. It was decided to adopt his proposition, endorsed by the commander of the department, and, to insure success, though not recommended in the endorsement, his old brigade, then in the Confederate Army of the Potomac, was selected as part of the command with which he was to make the campaign.

— President Jefferson Davis

His assembled forces of 11,000 men were a bit short of the 15,000 he desired to conduct the operation, but he proceeded on the expedition anyway.

Opposing Jackson were Banks's V Corps in Frederick, Maryland, which was patrolling and guarding the Potomac River from Harpers Ferry to Williamsport, Maryland. Additionally, Rosecrans had 5,000 men under Brigadier General Benjamin F. Kelley posted at Romney. Rosecrans had his own plans to capture what he thought was the lightly defended town of Winchester and fortify and hold it as a base of operations to threaten Confederate positions at Manassas Junction.

== The expedition ==
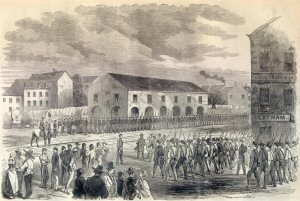
Confederate Militia mustering in Winchester, Virginia Harper's Weekly, 1861.

Jackson departed Winchester on January 1 with a force of about 9,000 men, under very warm spring-like weather conditions, leaving 2,000 to guard Winchester and the surrounding area. During the first night of the expedition, a severe winter storm set in, bringing snow, sleet and ice. One Confederate officer recalled:

The road was almost an uninterrupted sheet of ice, rendering it almost impossible for man or beast to travel, while by moonlight the beards of the men, matted with ice, glistened like crystals.

Despite adverse conditions, Jackson pressed on and occupied Bath, which had been evacuated by Brigadier General Frederick W. Lander, who had just superseded Rosecrans. Lander's forces retreated to Hancock, Maryland, and prevented Jackson from crossing the river in the Battle of Hancock. Jackson conducted an artillery bombardment, destroyed a section of the Baltimore and Ohio Railroad, and proceeded on to Romney.

While en route to Romney, Kelley made a reconnaissance-in-force towards Winchester, encountering leading Confederate militia from Jackson at Hanging Rock Pass. He easily defeated the Southerners and captured two artillery pieces. Despite this advantage, Kelley retreated from Romney on January 10, and Jackson entered and occupied the town on January 14. From here, Jackson planned his next step of advancing to Cumberland, Maryland, but the severe winter weather had so hampered the morale of many of his troops who were from warmer regions much further south, that he canceled his further expeditionary plans. Jackson left Loring's Division to occupy Romney and returned to Winchester on January 24 with his old Stonewall Brigade and Ashby's Regiment.

== Aftermath ==
Although his lofty goal of recapturing western Virginia was not achieved, Jackson did succeed in both thwarting a Union attack on Winchester and in clearing his new Valley District of all Federal forces. Jackson also effectively used Winchester as a "depot, headquarters and springboard" for various raids against the B&O Railroad.

=== The Romney Insurrection ===
In late January, discontented officers in Loring's Division wrote a letter of petition to the Confederate Secretary of War in Richmond, Virginia, resulting in an order from the Secretary to Jackson to withdraw Loring from Romney on grounds that his position was exposed to possible isolation by Federal forces. Jackson complied with the order, but angry with direct interference from Richmond internal to his command, he filed charges for a court-martial against Loring and resigned his commission, asking in a letter to Governor John Letcher on January 31 to be transferred to the position of Superintendent of the Virginia Military Institute (VMI) in Lexington, Virginia. Under pressure from his former commander General Joseph E. Johnston and from Governor Letcher, Jackson withdrew his resignation. The charges against Loring were dropped, however, and all non-Virginia forces, along with Loring, were reassigned out of the Valley District elsewhere, reducing Jackson's effective force to about 4,000 men.

This reduction had a direct impact upon Jackson's ability to defend the lower Shenandoah Valley, and led to the need to evacuate Winchester on March 9 in the face of superior forces advancing to Winchester under Union Maj. Gen. Banks. Therefore, despite having prevented Rosecrans's goal of taking Winchester in January or February 1862, the insurrection of Loring's Division and its subsequent reassignment led to the inevitable seizure of Winchester by General Banks in March. It was not until Jackson was able to be reinforced with more disciplined and seasoned troops from Major General Richard S. Ewell's Division that he would be able to retake the initiative in the Shenandoah Valley.

== See also ==
- Romney, West Virginia, during the American Civil War
- Winchester in the American Civil War
