= Jackson's Valley campaign =

1862 campaign in the American Civil War

Jackson’s Valley campaign
- Part of the American Civil War
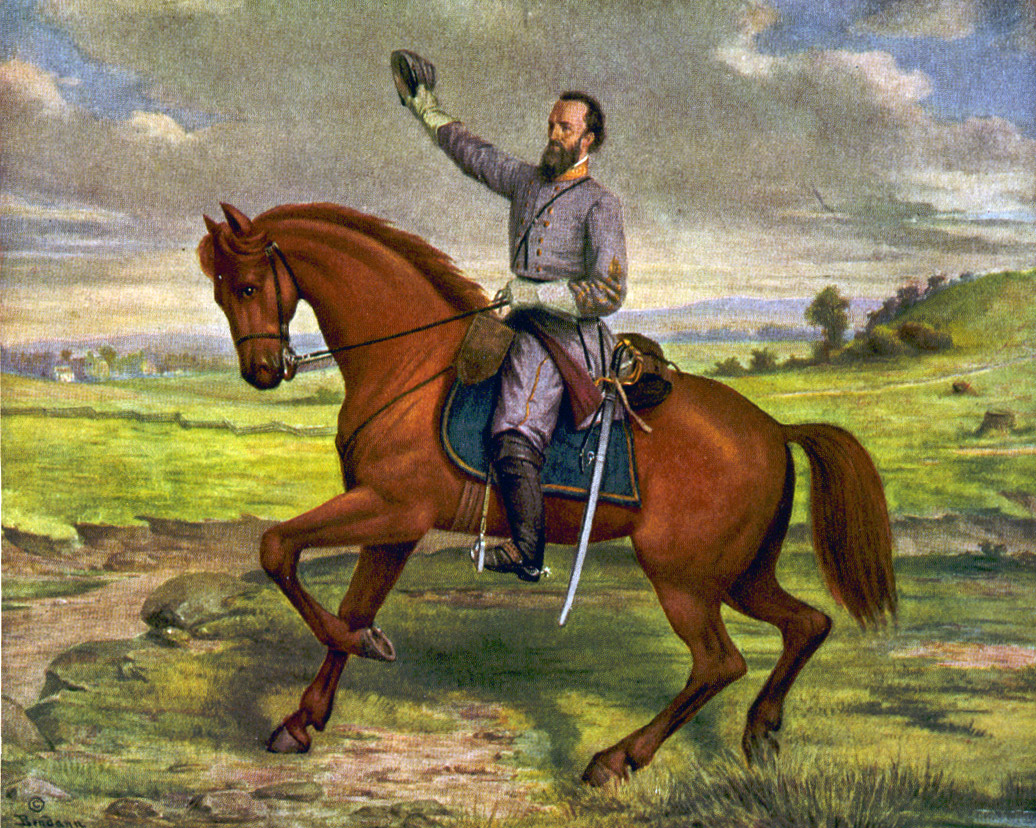
- Maj. Gen. Thomas J. "Stonewall" Jackson, commander of the Confederate forces in the Shenandoah Valley campaign of 1862
Date	March–June 1862
Location	Shenandoah Valley, Virginia 38.65°N 78.67°W
Result	Confederate victory

Belligerents
United States of America	Confederate States of America

Commanders and leaders
Nathaniel P. Banks; John C. Frémont; Irvin McDowell	“Stonewall” Jackson

Units involved
Department of the Shenandoah; Mountain Department; Department of the Rappahannock	Department of Northern Virginia: Valley District

Strength
52,000 (June 1862)	17,000

Casualties and losses
~7,000	2,677

Jackson's Valley campaign, also known as the Shenandoah Valley campaign of 1862, was Confederate Maj. Gen. Thomas J. "Stonewall" Jackson's spring 1862 campaign through the Shenandoah Valley in Virginia during the American Civil War. Employing risky and rapid, unpredictable movements on interior lines, Jackson's 17,000 men marched 646 miles (1,040 km) in 48 days and won several minor battles as they successfully engaged three Union armies (52,000 men), preventing them from reinforcing the Union offensive against Richmond.

Jackson suffered an initial tactical defeat at the First Battle of Kernstown (March 23, 1862) against Col. Nathan Kimball (part of Union Maj. Gen. Nathaniel P. Banks's army), but it proved to be a strategic Confederate victory because President Abraham Lincoln reinforced the Union's Valley forces with troops that had originally been designated for the Peninsula campaign against Richmond. Following Kernstown, Jackson retreated to form a line at Stony Creek south of Woodstock, making his headquarters at Narrow Passage on Stony Creek. It was there he summoned a local cartographer, Jedediah Hotchkiss, who recommended he withdraw from the indefensible Stony Creek to Rude's Hill, a strategic small promontory but a commanding defensive position astride the Valley Turnpike south of Mt. Jackson. It was at Rude's Hill, which was Jackson's headquarters from April 2–17, that Jackson reorganized his command. Jackson had instructed Hotchkiss to "make me a map of the Valley, from Harper's Ferry to Lexington, showing all the points of offence and defence [sic] in those places." The Shenandoah Valley had never been comprehensively mapped before, and Hotchkiss' maps and knowledge of the terrain proved to be a decisive tactical advantage for Jackson throughout the rest of the campaign.

On May 8, after more than a month of skirmishing with Banks, Jackson moved deceptively to the west of the Valley and drove back elements of Maj. Gen. John C. Frémont's army in the Battle of McDowell, preventing a potential combination of the two Union armies against him. Jackson then headed down the Valley once again to confront Banks. Concealing his movement in the Luray Valley, Jackson joined forces with Maj. Gen. Richard S. Ewell and captured the Federal garrison at Front Royal on May 23, causing Banks to retreat to the north. On May 25, in the First Battle of Winchester, Jackson defeated Banks and pursued him until the Union Army crossed the Potomac River into Maryland.

Bringing in Union reinforcements from eastern Virginia, Brig. Gen. James Shields recaptured Front Royal and planned to link up with Frémont in Strasburg. Jackson was now threatened by three small Union armies. Withdrawing up the Valley from Winchester, Jackson was pursued by Frémont and Shields. On June 8, Ewell defeated Frémont in the Battle of Cross Keys and on the following day, crossed the North River to join forces with Jackson to defeat Shields in the Battle of Port Republic, bringing the campaign to a close.

== Background ==
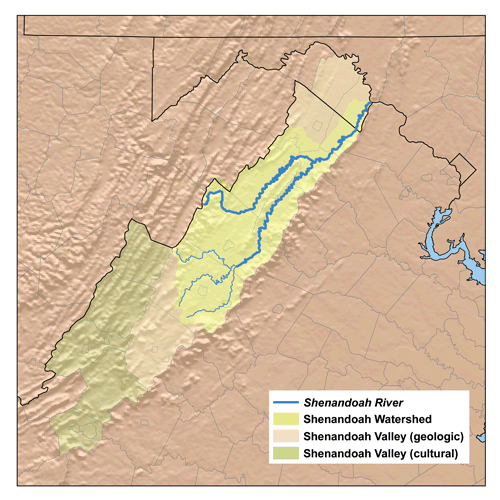
Shenandoah River watershed

In the spring of 1862 "Southern morale... was at its nadir" and "prospects for the Confederacy's survival seemed bleak." Following the successful summer of 1861, particularly the First Battle of Bull Run (First Manassas), its prospects declined quickly. Union armies in the Western Theater, under Ulysses S. Grant and others, captured Southern territory and won significant battles at Fort Donelson and Shiloh. And in the East, Maj. Gen. George B. McClellan's massive Army of the Potomac was approaching Richmond from the southeast in the Peninsula campaign, Maj. Gen. Irvin McDowell's large corps was poised to hit Richmond from the north, and Maj. Gen. Nathaniel P. Banks's army was threatening the Shenandoah Valley. However, Jackson's Confederate troops were in "excellent spirits," laying the foundation for his performance in the Valley that spring, which helped derail the Union plans and re-energize Confederate morale elsewhere.

During the Civil War, the Shenandoah Valley was one of the most strategic geographic features of Virginia. The watershed of the Shenandoah River passed between the Blue Ridge Mountains on the east and the Allegheny Mountains to the west, extending 140 miles southwest from the Potomac River at Shepherdstown and Harpers Ferry, at an average width of 25 miles. By the conventions of local residents, the "upper Valley" referred to the southwestern end, which had a generally higher elevation than the lower Valley to the northeast. Moving "up the Valley" meant traveling southwest, for instance. Between the North and South Forks of the Shenandoah River, Massanutten Mountain soared 2,900 feet and separated the Valley into two halves for about 50 miles, from Strasburg to Harrisonburg. During the 19th century, there was but a single road that crossed over the mountain, from New Market to Luray. The Valley offered two strategic advantages to the Confederates. First, a Northern army entering Virginia could be subjected to Confederate flanking attacks pouring through the many wind gaps across the Blue Ridge. Second, the Valley offered a protected avenue that allowed Confederate armies to head north into Pennsylvania unimpeded; this was the route taken by Gen. Robert E. Lee to invade the North in the Gettysburg campaign of 1863 and by Lt. Gen. Jubal A. Early in the Valley campaigns of 1864. In contrast, the orientation of the Valley offered little advantage to a Northern army headed toward Richmond. But denying the Valley to the Confederacy would be a significant blow. It was an agriculturally rich area—the 2.5 million bushels of wheat produced in 1860, for example, accounted for about 19% of the crop in the entire state and the Valley was also rich in livestock—that was used to provision Virginia's armies and the Confederate capital of Richmond. If the Federals could reach Staunton in the upper Valley, they would threaten the vital Virginia and Tennessee Railroad, which ran from Richmond to the Mississippi River. Stonewall Jackson wrote to a staff member, "If this Valley is lost, Virginia is lost." In addition to Jackson's campaign in 1862, the Valley was subjected to conflict for virtually the entire war, most notably in the Valley campaigns of 1864.

== Opposing forces ==
=== Confederate ===
Confederate Commander and Key Subordinates
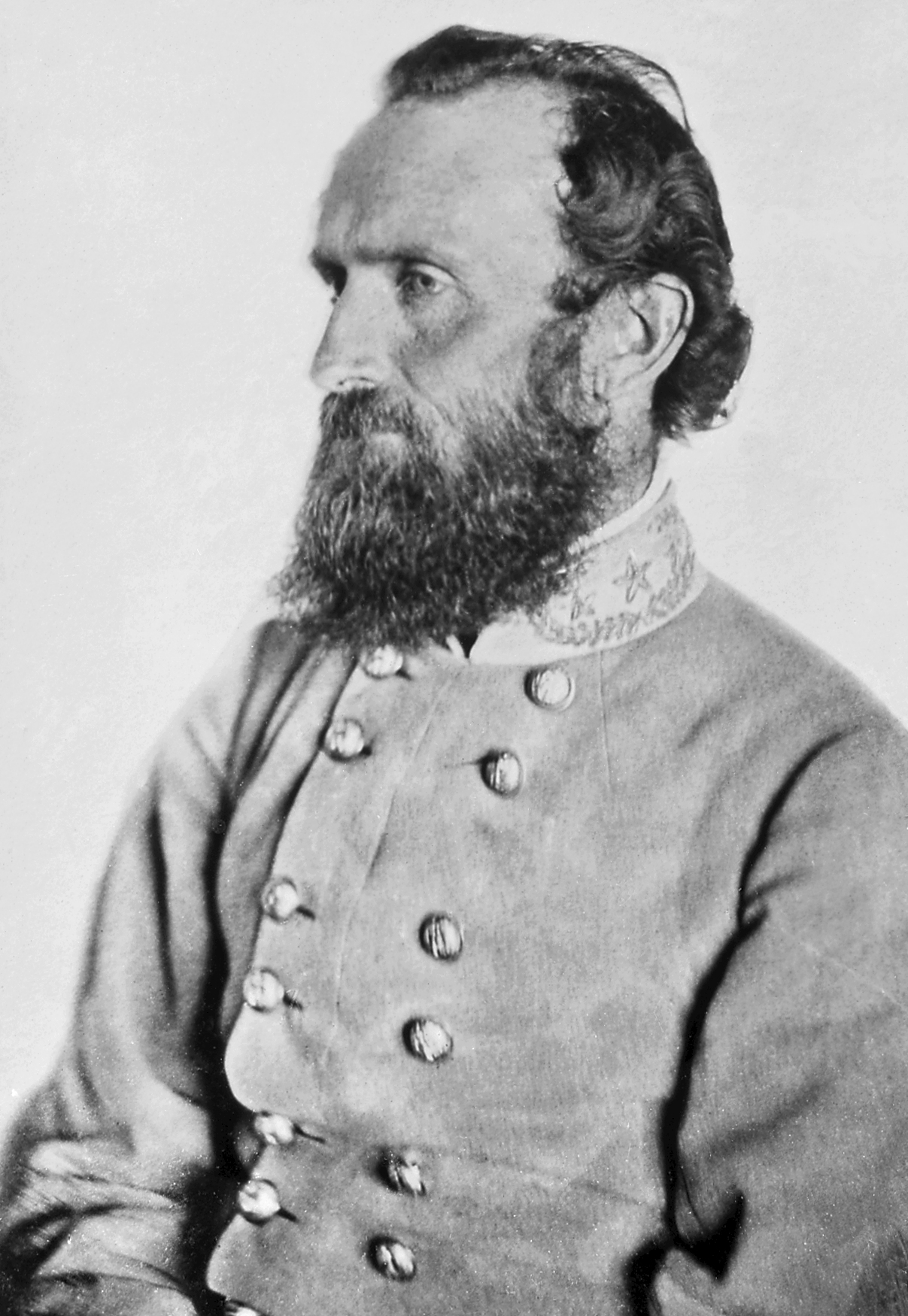
Maj. Gen.
Stonewall Jackson, Commanding

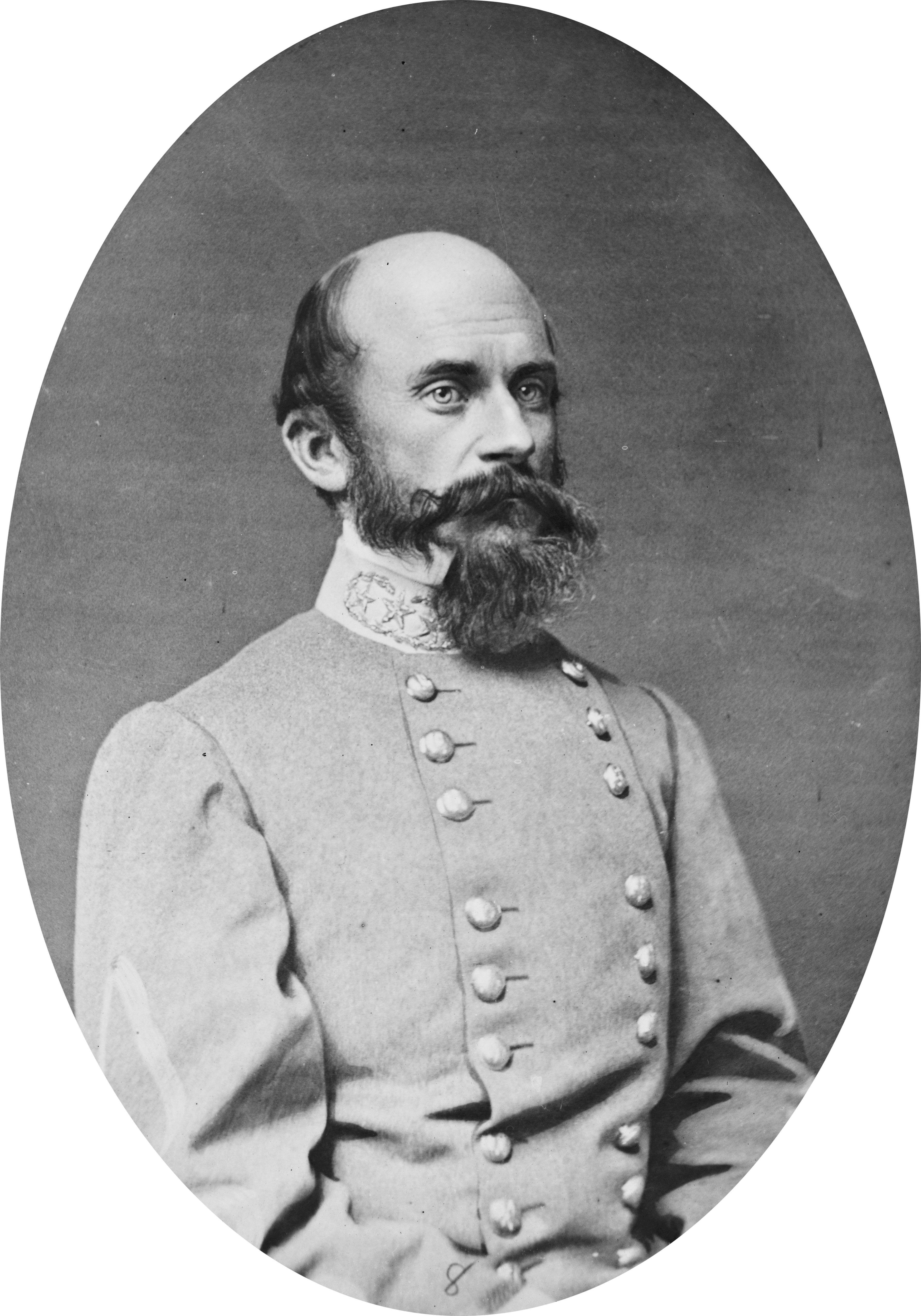
Maj. Gen.
Richard S. Ewell

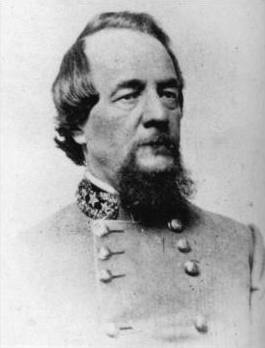
Brig. Gen.
Edward "Allegheny" Johnson

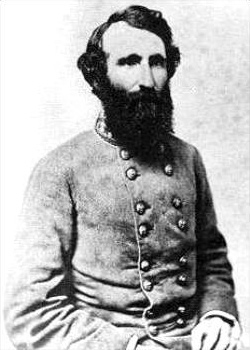
Brig. Gen.
William B. Taliaferro

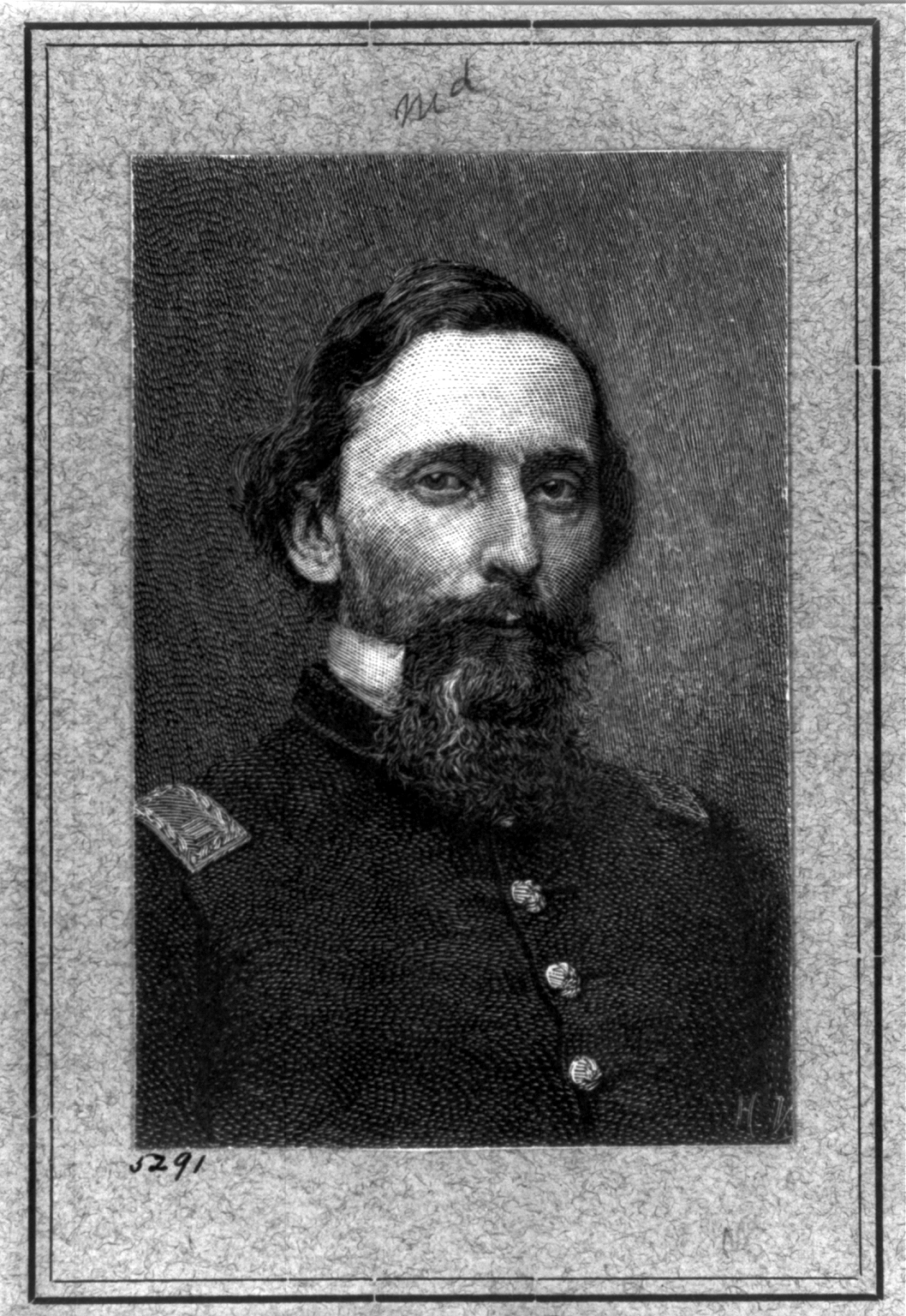
Brig. Gen.
Charles S. Winder

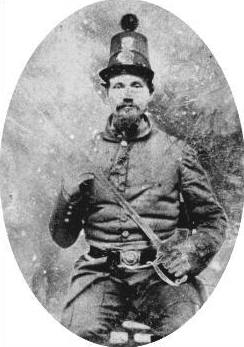
Col.
Turner Ashby Jr.

Stonewall Jackson's command, the Valley District of the Department of Northern Virginia, expanded significantly during the campaign as reinforcements were added, starting with a force of a mere 5,000 effectives and reaching an eventual peak of 17,000 men. It remained, however, greatly outnumbered by the various Union armies opposing it, which together numbered 52,000 men in June 1862.

In March 1862, at the time of the Battle of Kernstown, Jackson commanded the brigades of Brig. Gen. Richard B. Garnett, Col. Jesse S. Burks, Col. Samuel V. Fulkerson, and cavalry under Col. Turner Ashby. In early May, at the Battle of McDowell, Jackson commanded two units that were putatively armies, although they were smaller than normal divisions: his own "Army of the Valley", consisting of the brigades of Brig. Gen. Charles S. Winder, Col. John A. Campbell, and Brig. Gen. William B. Taliaferro; the Army of the Northwest, commanded by Brig. Gen. Edward "Allegheny" Johnson, consisted of the brigades of Cols. Zephaniah T. Conner and W.C. Scott.

In late May and June, for the battles starting at Front Royal, Jackson commanded two infantry divisions and a cavalry command. "Jackson's Division" consisted of the brigades of Brig. Gen. Charles S. Winder, Col. John A. Campbell (wounded and replaced by Col. John M. Patton Jr.), and Col. Samuel V. Fulkerson (replaced by Brig. Gen. William B. Taliaferro). The Second Division, commanded by Maj. Gen. Richard S. Ewell, consisted of the brigades commanded by Col. W.C. Scott (replaced by Brig. Gen. George H. Steuart), Brig. Gen. Arnold Elzey (replaced by Col. James A. Walker), Brig. Gen. Isaac R. Trimble, Brig. Gen. Richard Taylor, and Brig. Gen. George H. Steuart (an all-Maryland brigade known as the "Maryland Line"). The cavalry was commanded during the period by Col. Thomas S. Flournoy, Brig. Gen. George H. Steuart, Brig. Gen. Turner Ashby, and Col. Thomas T. Munford.

=== Union ===
Union Department Commanders
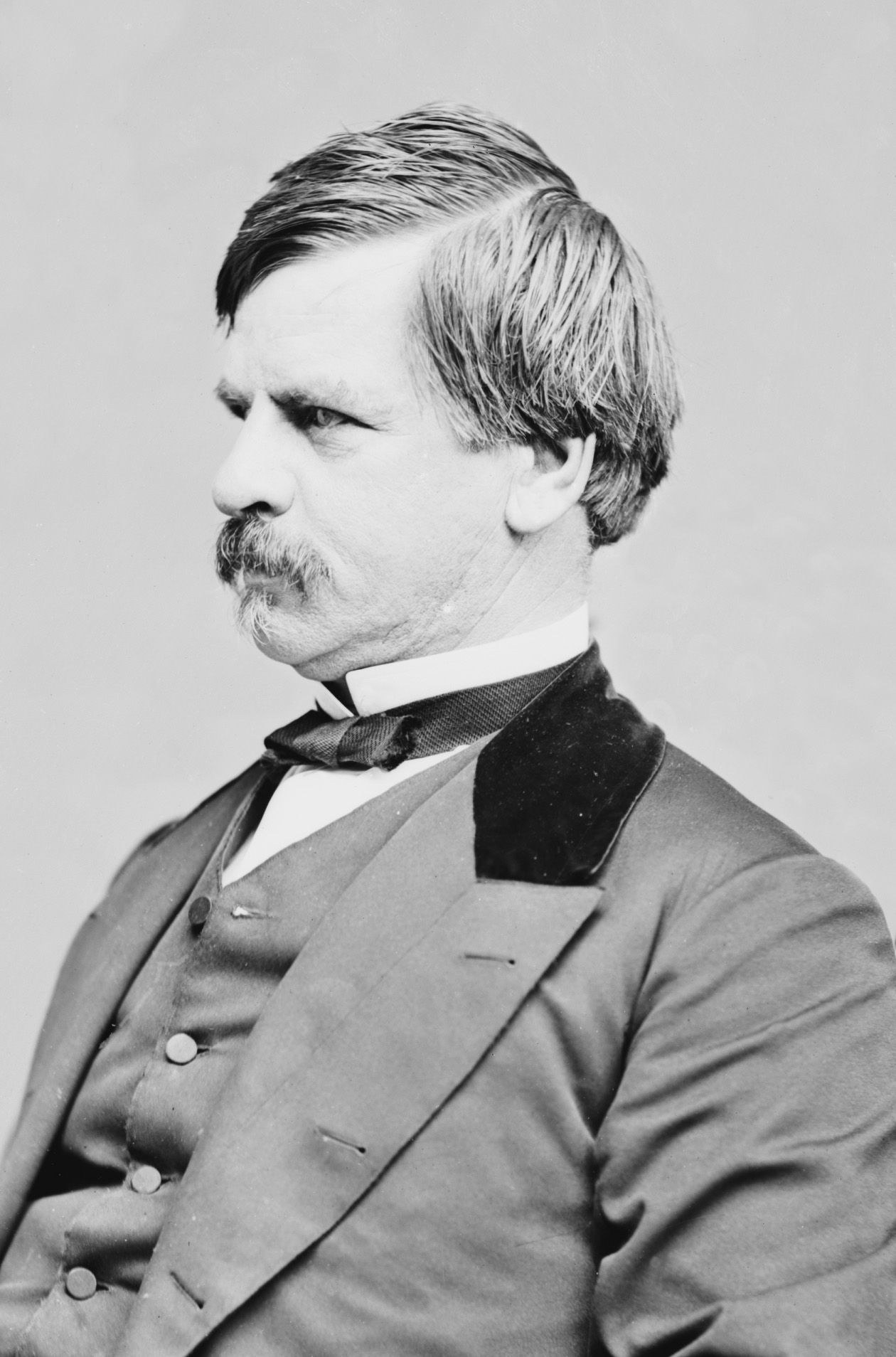
Maj. Gen.
Nathaniel P. Banks, Department of the Shenandoah

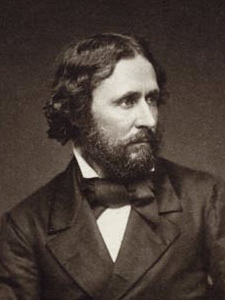
Maj. Gen.
John C. Frémont, Mountain Department

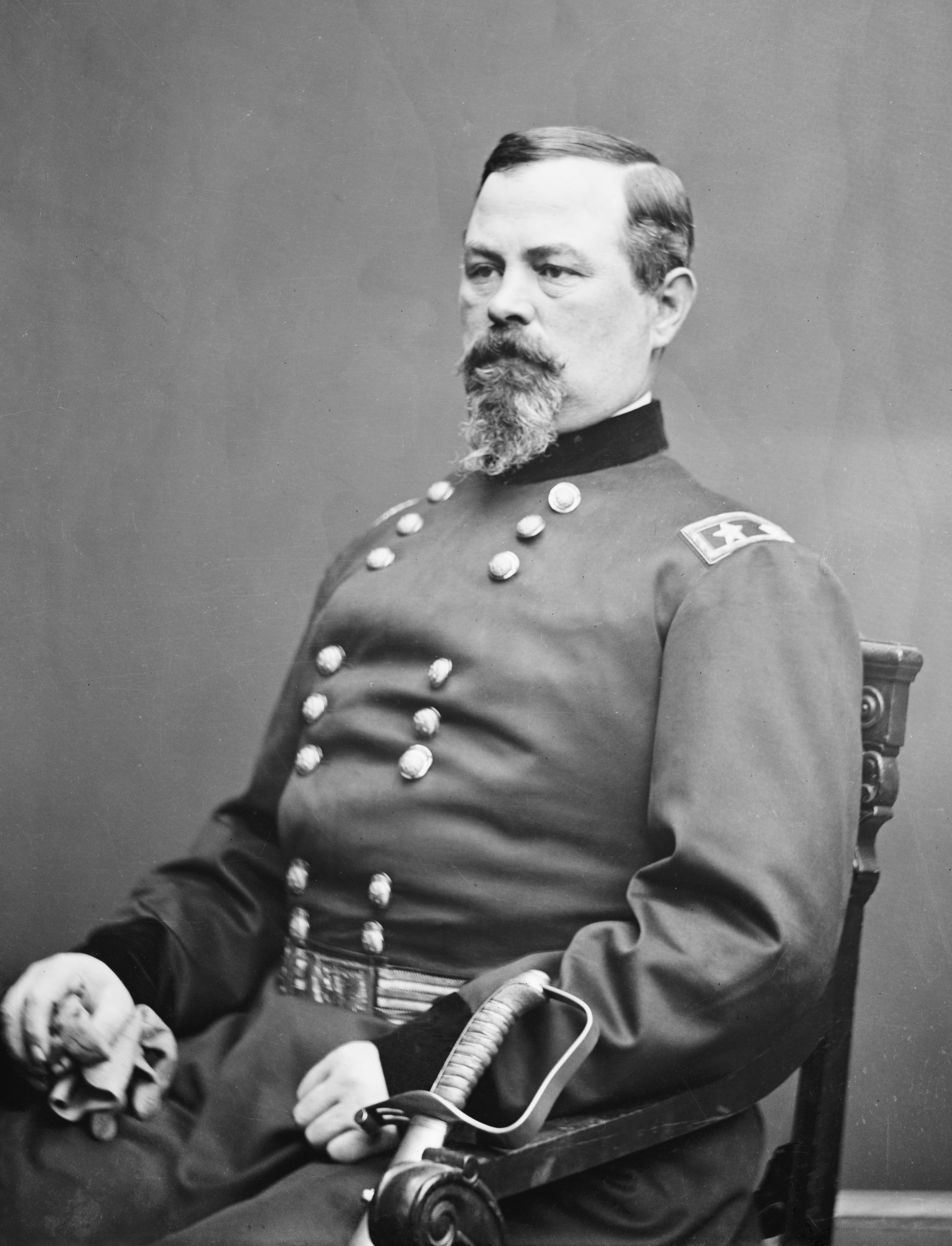
Maj. Gen.
Irvin McDowell, Department of the Rappahannock

Key Union Subordinates
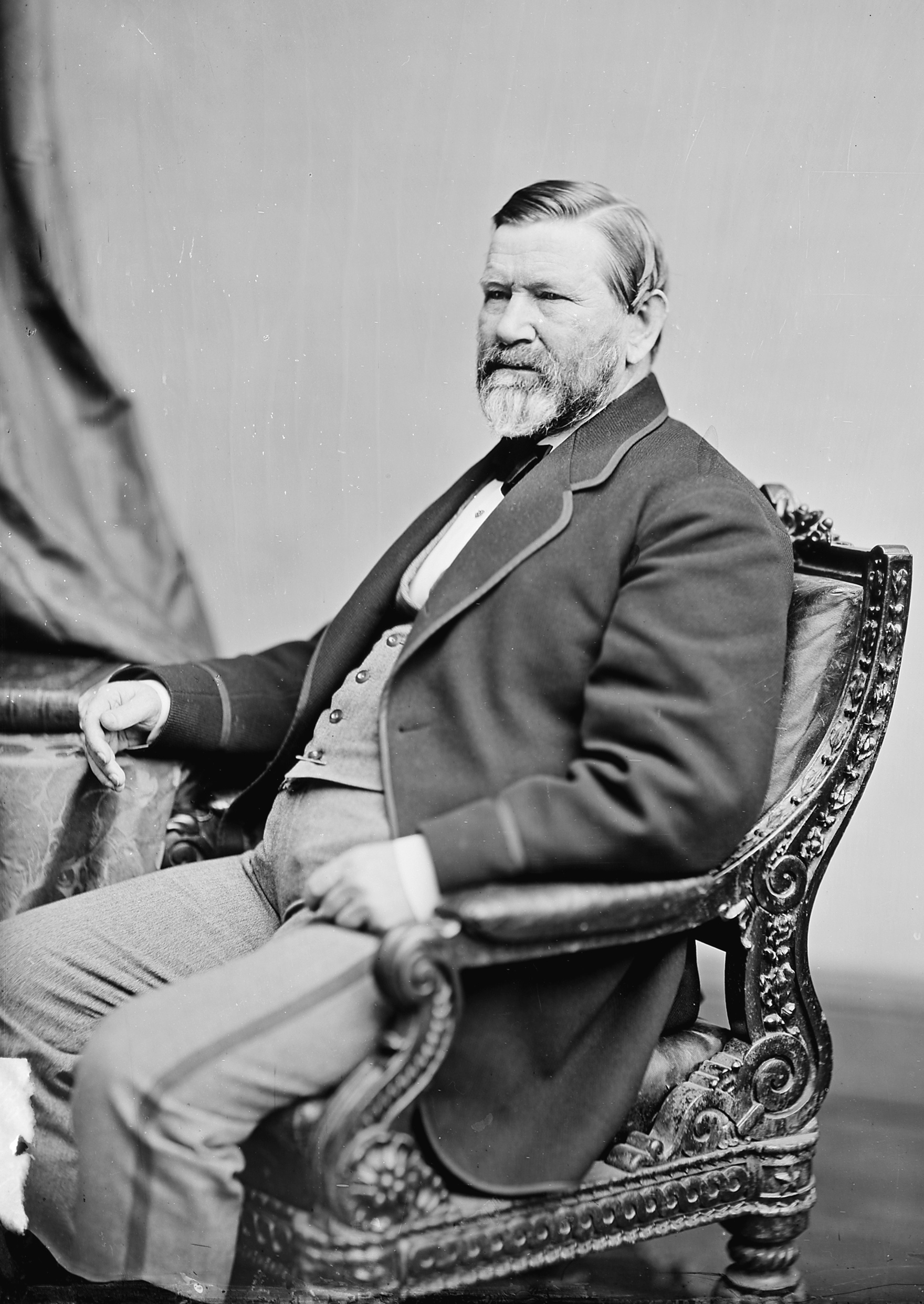
Brig. Gen.
Robert C. Schenck

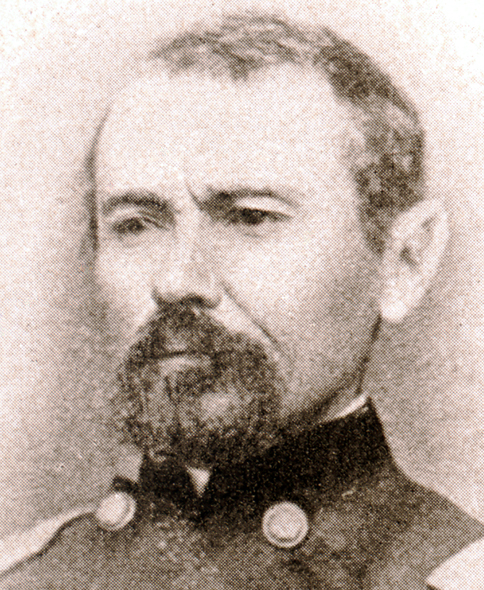
Brig. Gen.
John Reese Kenly

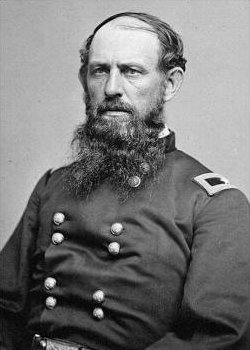
Brig. Gen.
Erastus B. Tyler

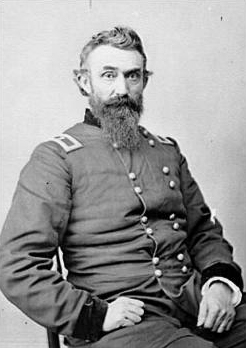
Col.
Nathan Kimball

Union forces varied considerably during the campaign as armies arrived and withdrew from the Valley. The forces were generally from three independent commands, an arrangement which reduced the effectiveness of the Union response to Jackson.

Initially, the Valley was the responsibility of Maj. Gen. Nathaniel P. Banks. In March 1862, at the time of the Battle of Kernstown, he commanded the V Corps of the Army of the Potomac; and on April 4, he assumed command of the Department of the Shenandoah. His force initially consisted of two divisions under Brig. Gens. James Shields and Alpheus S. Williams, with an independent brigade under Brig. Gen. John W. Geary. At Kernstown, Shields' division was led by Col. Nathan Kimball with brigades under Kimball, Col. Jeremiah C. Sullivan, Col. Erastus B. Tyler, and cavalry under Col. Thornton F. Brodhead. At the end of April, Shields' division would be transferred from Banks to McDowell's command, leaving Banks with just one division, under Williams, consisting of the brigades of Cols. Dudley Donnelly and George H. Gordon, and a cavalry brigade under Brig. Gen. John P. Hatch.

Maj. Gen. John C. Frémont commanded the Mountain Department, west of the Valley. In early May, part of Frémont's command consisting of Brig. Gen. Robert C. Schenck's brigade and Brig. Gen. Robert H. Milroy's brigade faced Jackson at the Battle of McDowell. At the end of May, Fremont entered the Valley with a division under Brig. Gen. Louis Blenker, consisting of brigades of Brig. Gen. Julius H. Stahel, Col. John A. Koltes, and Brig. Gen. Henry Bohlen, as well as brigades under Col. Gustave P. Cluseret, Brig. Gen. Robert H. Milroy, Brig. Gen. Robert C. Schenck, and Brig. Gen. George D. Bayard.

Also at the end of May, McDowell was ordered to send troops to the Valley. Thus Shields returned to the Valley with his division consisting of the brigades of Brig. Gen. Nathan Kimball, Brig. Gen. Orris S. Ferry, Brig. Gen. Erastus B. Tyler, and Col. Samuel S. Carroll.

== Initial movements ==
On November 4, 1861, Jackson accepted command of the Valley District, with his headquarters at Winchester. Jackson, recently a professor at Virginia Military Institute and suddenly a hero at First Manassas, was familiar with the valley terrain, having lived there for many years. His command included the Stonewall Brigade and a variety of militia units. In December, Jackson was reinforced by Brig. Gen. William W. Loring and 6,000 troops, but his combined force was insufficient for offensive operations. While Banks remained north of the Potomac River, Jackson's cavalry commander, Col. Turner Ashby, raided the Chesapeake and Ohio Canal and the Baltimore and Ohio Railroad. In the Romney Expedition of early January 1862, Jackson fought inconclusively with two small Union posts at Hancock, Maryland, and Bath.

In late February, Maj. Gen. George B. McClellan ordered Banks, reinforced by Brig. Gen. John Sedgwick, across the Potomac to protect the canal and railroad from Ashby. Banks moved south against Winchester in conjunction with Shields's division approaching from the direction of Romney. Jackson's command was operating as the left wing of Gen. Joseph E. Johnston's army, and when Johnston withdrew from Manassas to Culpeper in March, Jackson's position at Winchester was isolated. He began withdrawing "up" the Valley (to the higher elevations at the southwest end of the Valley) to cover the flank of Gen. Joseph E. Johnston's army, withdrawing from the Centreville–Manassas area to protect Richmond. Without this protective movement, the Federal army under Banks might strike at Johnston through passes in the Blue Ridge Mountains. By March 12, 1862, Banks occupied Winchester just after Jackson had withdrawn from the town, marching at a leisurely pace 42 miles up the Valley Pike to Mount Jackson. On March 21, Jackson received word that Banks was splitting his force, with two divisions (under Brig. Gens. John Sedgwick and Alpheus S. Williams) returning to the immediate vicinity of Washington, D.C., freeing up other Union troops to participate in Maj. Gen. George B. McClellan's Peninsula campaign against Richmond. The remaining division, under Brig. Gen. James Shields, was stationed at Strasburg to guard the lower (northeastern) Valley, and intelligence indicated that it was withdrawing toward Winchester. Banks made preparations to leave the Valley personally on March 23.

== Valley campaign ==
=== Kernstown (March 23, 1862) ===
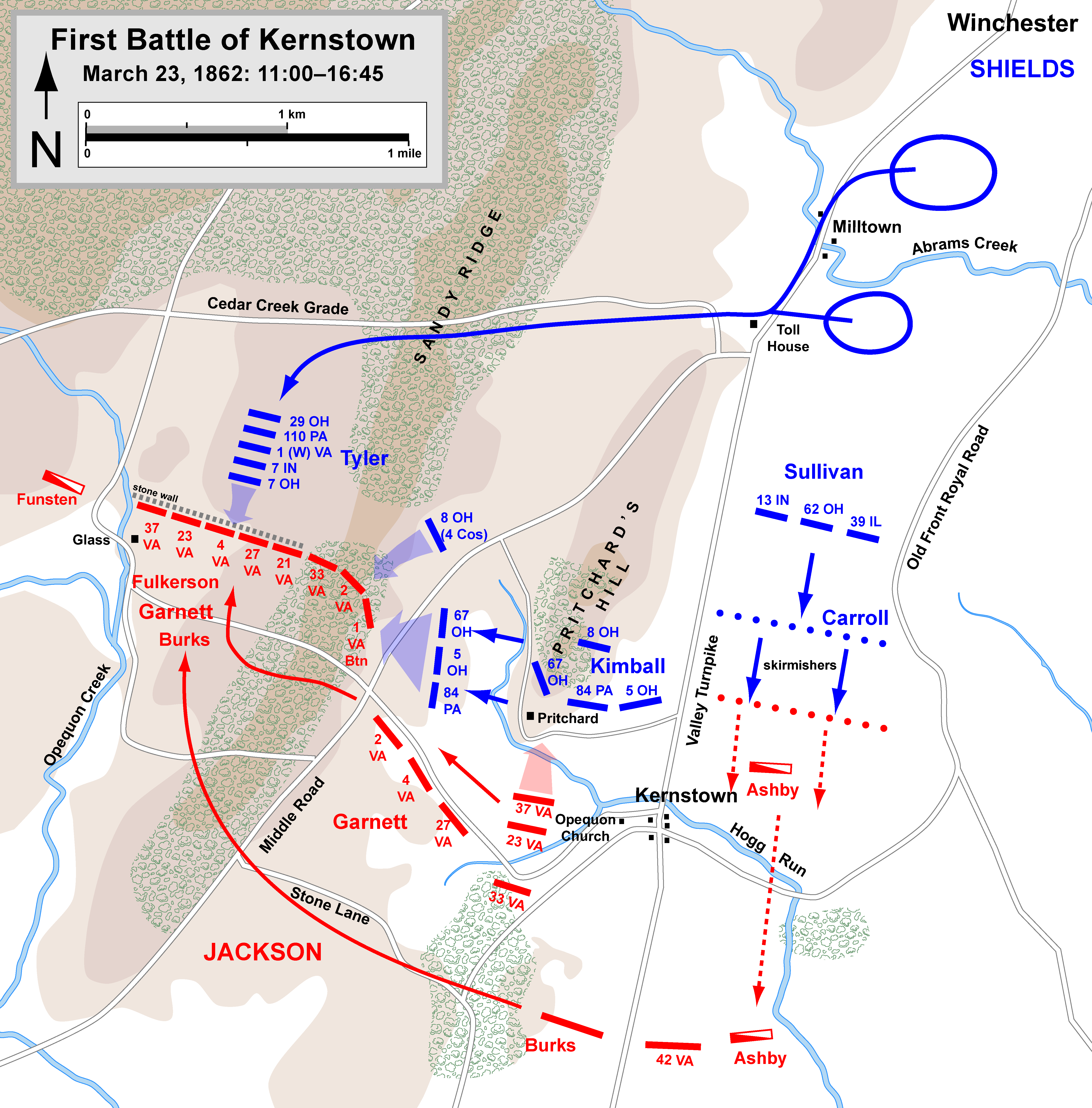
Actions at the First Battle of Kernstown, 11 a.m. to 4:45 p.m. Confederate Union

Jackson's orders from Johnston were to prevent Banks's force from leaving the Valley, which it appeared they were now doing. Jackson turned his men around and, in one of the more grueling forced marches of the war, moved northeast 25 miles on March 22 and another 15 to Kernstown on the morning of March 23. Ashby's cavalry skirmished with the Federals on March 22, during which engagement Shields was wounded with a broken arm from an artillery shell fragment. Despite his injury, Shields sent part of his division south of Winchester and one brigade marching to the north, seemingly abandoning the area, but in fact halting nearby to remain in reserve. He then turned over tactical command of his division to Col. Nathan Kimball, although throughout the battle to come, he sent numerous messages and orders to Kimball. Confederate loyalists in Winchester mistakenly informed Turner Ashby that Shields had left only four regiments and a few guns (about 3,000 men) and that these remaining troops had orders to march for Harpers Ferry in the morning. Jackson marched aggressively north with his 3,000-man division, reduced from its peak as stragglers fell out of the column, unaware that he was soon to be attacking almost 9,000 men.

Jackson moved north from Woodstock and arrived before the Union position at Kernstown around 11 a.m., Sunday, March 23. He sent Turner Ashby on a feint against Kimball's position on the Valley Turnpike while his main force—the brigades of Col. Samuel Fulkerson and Brig. Gen. Richard B. Garnett (the Stonewall Brigade)—attacked the Union artillery position on Pritchard Hill. The lead brigade under Fulkerson was repulsed, so Jackson decided to move around the Union right flank, about 2 miles west on Sandy Ridge, which appeared to be unoccupied. Kimball countered the maneuver by moving his brigade under Col. Erastus B. Tyler to the west, but Fulkerson's men reached a stone wall facing a clearing on the ridge before the Union men could.

Around 4 p.m, Tyler attacked Fulkerson and Garnett on a narrow front. The Confederates were temporarily able to counter this attack with their inferior numbers by firing fierce volleys from behind the stone wall. Jackson, finally realizing the strength of the force opposing him, rushed reinforcements to his left, but by the time they arrived around 6 p.m., Garnett's Stonewall Brigade had run out of ammunition and he pulled them back, leaving Fulkerson's right flank exposed. Jackson tried in vain to rally his troops to hold, but the entire Confederate force was forced into a general retreat. Kimball organized no effective pursuit.

Union casualties were 590 (118 killed, 450 wounded, 22 captured or missing), Confederate 718 (80 killed, 375 wounded, 263 captured or missing). Despite the Union victory, President Lincoln was disturbed by Jackson's audacity and his potential threat to Washington. He sent Banks back to the Valley along with Alpheus Williams's division. He also was concerned that Jackson might move into western Virginia against Maj. Gen. John C. Frémont, so he ordered that the division of Brig. Gen. Louis Blenker be detached from McClellan's Army of the Potomac and sent to reinforce Frémont. Lincoln also took this opportunity to re-examine Maj. Gen. George B. McClellan's plans for the defenses of Washington while the Peninsula campaign was underway and decided that the forces were insufficient. He eventually ordered that the corps of Maj. Gen. Irvin McDowell, which was moving south against Richmond in support of McClellan, remain in the vicinity of the capital. McClellan claimed that the loss of these forces prevented him from taking Richmond during his campaign. The strategic realignment of Union forces caused by Jackson's battle at Kernstown—the only battle he lost in his military career—turned out to be a strategic victory for the Confederacy.

After the battle, Jackson arrested Brig. Gen. Richard B. Garnett for retreating from the battlefield before permission was received. He was replaced by Brig. Gen. Charles S. Winder. Garnett suffered from the humiliation of his court-martial for over a year, until he was finally killed in Pickett's Charge at the Battle of Gettysburg.

=== Retreating from the Valley (March 24 – May 7) ===
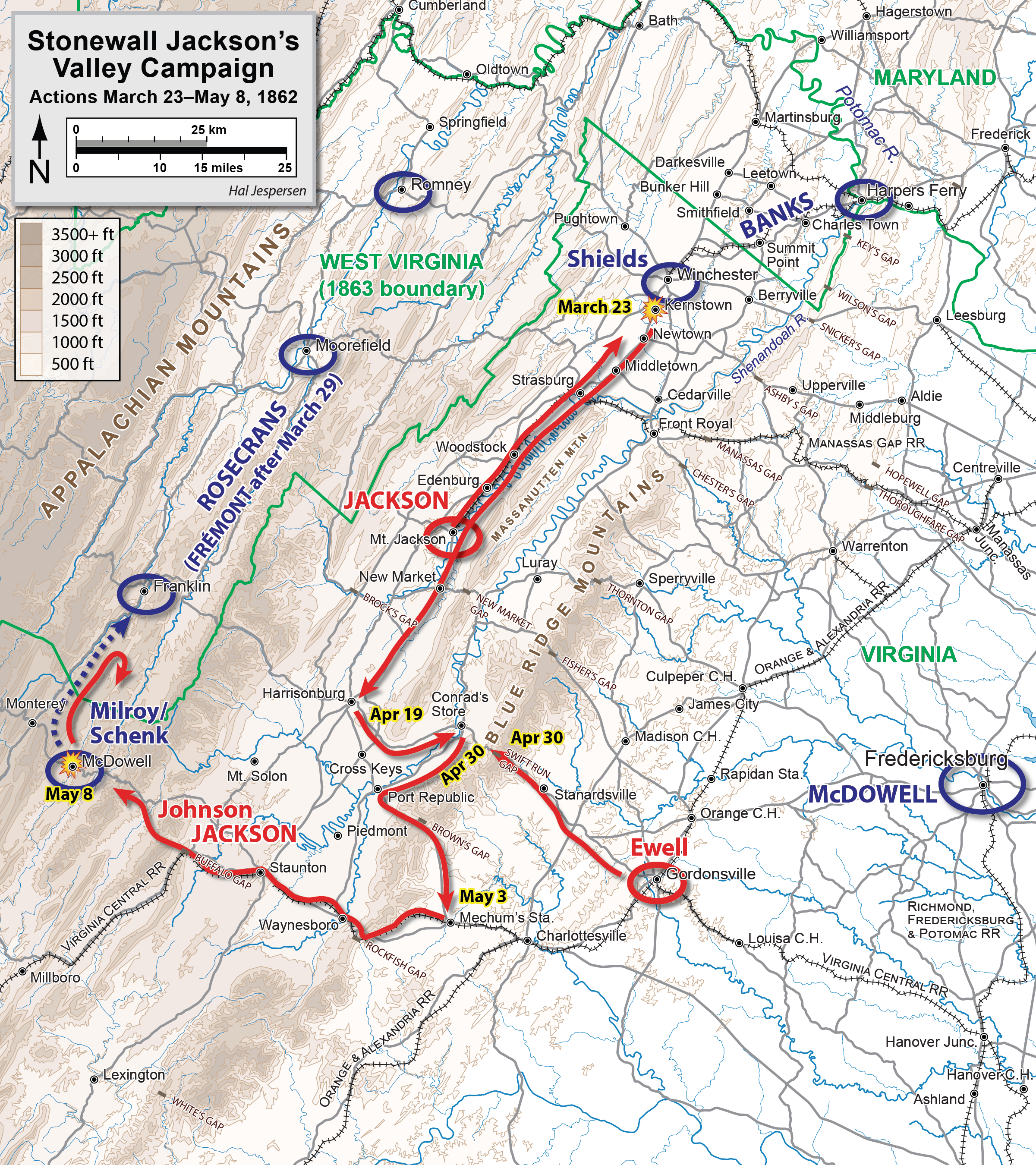
Kernstown (March 23) to McDowell (May 8)

At first light the day after Kernstown, Union forces pursued Jackson and drove Ashby's cavalry in a panic. However, Banks called off the pursuit while supply problems were addressed. For the next three days the Union forces advanced slowly while Jackson retreated to Mount Jackson. It was there that he directed Capt. Jedediah Hotchkiss, "I want you to make me a map of the Valley, from Harpers Ferry to Lexington, showing all the points of offense and defense." Given Hotchkiss's mapmaking skills, Jackson would have a significant advantage over his Federal opponents in the campaign to come. On April 1, Banks lunged forward, advancing to Woodstock along Stony Creek, where he once again was delayed by supply problems. Jackson took up a new position at Rude's Hill near Mount Jackson and New Market.

Banks advanced again on April 16, surprising Ashby's cavalry by fording Stony Creek at a place they had neglected to picket, capturing 60 of the horsemen, while the remainder of Ashby's command fought their way back to Jackson's position on Rude's Hill. Jackson assumed that Banks had been reinforced, so he abandoned his position and marched quickly up the Valley to Harrisonburg on April 18. On April 19, his men marched 20 miles east out of the Shenandoah valley to Swift Run Gap. Banks occupied New Market and crossed Massanutten Mountain to seize the bridges across the South Fork in the Luray Valley, once again besting Ashby's cavalry, who failed to destroy the bridges in time. Banks now controlled the valley as far south as Harrisonburg.

Though Banks was aware of Jackson's location, he misinterpreted Jackson's intent, thinking that Jackson was heading east of the Blue Ridge to aid Richmond. Without clear direction from Washington as to his next objective, Banks proposed his force also be sent east of the Blue Ridge, telling his superiors that "such [an] order would electrify our force." Instead, Lincoln decided to detach Shield's division and transfer it to Maj. Gen. Irvin McDowell at Fredericksburg, leaving Banks in the Valley with only a single division. Banks was then instructed to retreat down the valley and assume a defensive position at Strasburg.

By this time, McClellan's Peninsula campaign was well underway and Joseph E. Johnston had relocated most of his army for the direct protection of Richmond, leaving Jackson's force isolated. Johnston sent new orders to Jackson, instructing him to prevent Banks from seizing Staunton and the Virginia and Tennessee Railroad, reinforcing him with the 8,500-man division under Maj. Gen. Richard S. Ewell, left behind at Brandy Station. Jackson, at a strong defensive position on Rude's Hill, corresponded with Ewell to develop a strategy for the campaign.

During this period, Jackson also faced difficulty within his own command. He arrested Garnett and had a nasty confrontation with Turner Ashby in which Jackson displayed his displeasure at Ashby's performance by stripping him of 10 of his 21 cavalry companies and reassigning them to Charles S. Winder, Garnett's replacement in command of the Stonewall Brigade. Winder mediated between the two officers and the stubborn Jackson uncharacteristically backed down, restoring Ashby's command. More importantly, Jackson received an April 21 letter from Gen. Robert E. Lee, military adviser to President Jefferson Davis, requesting that he and Ewell attack Banks to reduce the threat against Richmond that was being posed by McDowell at Fredericksburg.

Jackson's plan was to have Ewell's division move into position at Swift Run Gap to threaten Banks's flank, while Jackson's force marched toward the Allegheny Mountains to assist the detached 2,800 men under Brig. Gen. Edward "Allegheny" Johnson, who were resisting the advance toward Staunton of Brig. Gen. Robert H. Milroy, the leading element of Maj. Gen. John C. Frémont's army. If Frémont and Banks were allowed to combine, Jackson's forces could be overwhelmed, so Jackson planned to defeat them in detail. Without waiting for Lee's reply, Jackson executed his plan and on April 30, Ewell's division replaced Jackson's men at Swift Run Gap. Jackson marched south to the town of Port Republic in heavy rains and on May 2, turned his men east in the direction of Charlottesville and began marching over the Blue Ridge. To the surprise of his men and officers, whom Jackson habitually left in the dark as to his intentions, on May 4 they boarded trains that were heading west, not east toward Richmond, as they had anticipated. The movement to the east had been a clever deception. On May 5, Jackson's army camped around Staunton, about 6 miles from Johnson's command. On May 7, Milroy, whose troops were based at McDowell, with pickets east of the mountain (elements of the 32nd Ohio) as an advance picket, and more troops posted around North Mountain, received intelligence that Jackson and Johnson were combining against him, and skirmishing intensified across the valley between Union and Confederate pickets. Despite wishing for battle, he began to fall back across the Alleghenies due to knowledge of the enemy's numerical superiority, and he dispatched requests to Franklin for reinforcements, which General Robert Schenck obliged by preparing his troops to move southwards to reinforce Milroy at 11:00 AM on May 7. Milroy attempted to stifle the rebel advance over Shenandoah Mountain by posting two artillery pieces along the road, which slowed down Jackson's column. As more Confederate columns continued to cross the mountains, Milroy decided to retreat northwards for McDowell and await arrival of reinforcements. On the morning of May 8, Milroy's command was surprised to see the Confederate troops moving to occupy strong positions atop Bull Pasture Mountain. Milroy immediately decided that a swift attack must be done while the rebel forces had still not consolidated their position, so he ordered his artillery to bombard the rebel positions atop Bull Pasture Mountain. Soon afterwards, at 10:00 AM, Schenck's column arrived and reinforced Milroy.

=== McDowell (May 8) ===
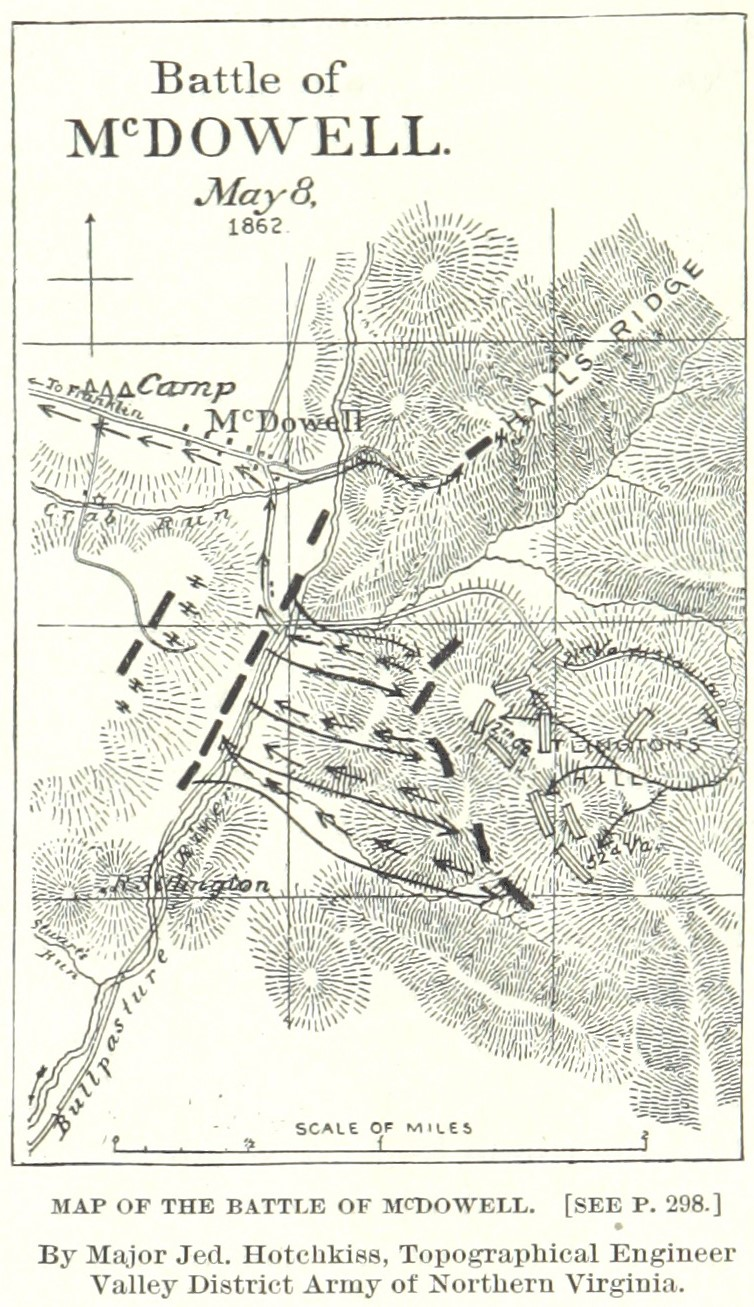
A map of the battle by Jedediah Hotchkiss

As Milroy withdrew north of McDowell On May 8, Jackson arrived at McDowell, a village in Highland County, to find that Allegheny Johnson was deploying his infantry. The Union force of about 6,000 under Milroy and Schenck was camped in the village to the west side of the Bullpasture River. Overlooking the scene was a spur of Bullpasture Mountain known as Sitlington Hill, a mile-long plateau that could potentially dominate the Union position. However, there were two disadvantages: the single trail that reached the summit was so difficult that artillery could not be deployed there, and the rugged terrain—densely forested, steep slopes and ravines—offered opportunities for Union attackers to climb the 500 feet to the summit without being subjected to constant Confederate fire.

The Union generals realized that they were outnumbered by the 10,000 men that Jackson and Johnson commanded and that their men would be particularly vulnerable to artillery fire from Sitlington Hill. They did not realize that Jackson could not bring up his artillery. Therefore, in order to buy time for their troops to withdraw at night, Milroy recommended a preemptive assault on the hill and Schenck, his superior officer, approved. At about 4:30 p.m., 2,300 Federal troops crossed the river and assaulted Sitlington Hill. Their initial assault almost broke Johnson's right, but Jackson sent up Taliaferro's infantry and repulsed the Federals. The next attack was at the vulnerable center of the Confederate line, where the 12th Georgia Infantry occupied a salient that was subjected to fire from both sides. The Georgians, the only non-Virginians on the Confederate side, proudly and defiantly refused to withdraw to a more defensible position and took heavy casualties as they stood and fired, silhouetted against the bright sky as easy targets at the crest of the hill. One Georgia private exclaimed, "We did not come all this way to Virginia to run before Yankees." By the end of the day the 540 Georgians suffered 180 casualties, losses three times greater than any other regiment on the field. Johnson was wounded and Taliaferro assumed command of the battle while Jackson brought up additional reinforcements. The fighting continued until about 10 p.m., when the Union troops withdrew.

Milroy and Schenck marched their men north from McDowell beginning at 12:30 a.m. on May 9. Jackson attempted to pursue, but by the time his men started the Federals were already 13 miles away. On a high ridge overlooking the road to Franklin, Schenck took up a defensive position and Jackson did not attempt to attack him. Union casualties were 259 (34 killed, 220 wounded, 5 missing), Confederate 420 (116 killed, 300 wounded, 4 missing), one of the rare cases in the Civil War where the attacker lost fewer men than the defender.

=== Conflicting orders (May 10–22) ===
While Jackson was at McDowell, Ewell was fidgeting at Swift Run Gap, trying to sort out numerous orders he was receiving from Jackson and Johnston. On May 13, Jackson ordered Ewell to pursue Banks if he withdrew down the Valley from Strasburg, whereas Johnston had ordered Ewell to leave the Valley and return to the army protecting Richmond if Banks moved eastward to join McDowell at Fredericksburg. Since Shields's division was reported to have left the Valley, Ewell was in a quandary about which orders to follow. He met in person with Jackson on May 18 at Mount Solon and the two generals decided that while in the Valley, Ewell reported operationally to Jackson, and that a prime opportunity existed to attack Banks's army, now depleted to fewer than 10,000 men, with their combined forces. When subsequent peremptory orders came to Ewell from Johnston to abandon this idea and march to Richmond, Jackson was forced to telegraph for help from Robert E. Lee, who convinced President Davis that a potential victory in the Valley had more immediate importance than countering Shields. Johnston modified his orders to Ewell: "The object you have to accomplish is the prevention of the junction of General Banks's troops and those of General McDowell's."

On May 21, Jackson marched his command east from New Market over Massanutten Mountain, combining with Ewell on May 22, and proceeded down the Luray Valley. Their speed of forced marching was typical of the campaign and earned his infantrymen the nickname of "Jackson's foot cavalry". He sent Ashby's cavalry directly north to make Banks think that he was going to attack Strasburg, where Banks began to be concerned that his 4,476 infantry, 1,600 cavalry, and 16 artillery pieces might be insufficient to withstand Jackson's 16,000 men. However, Jackson's plan was first to defeat the small Federal outpost at Front Royal (about 1,000 men of the 1st Maryland Infantry under Col. John R. Kenly), a turning movement that would make the Strasburg position untenable.

=== Front Royal (May 23) ===
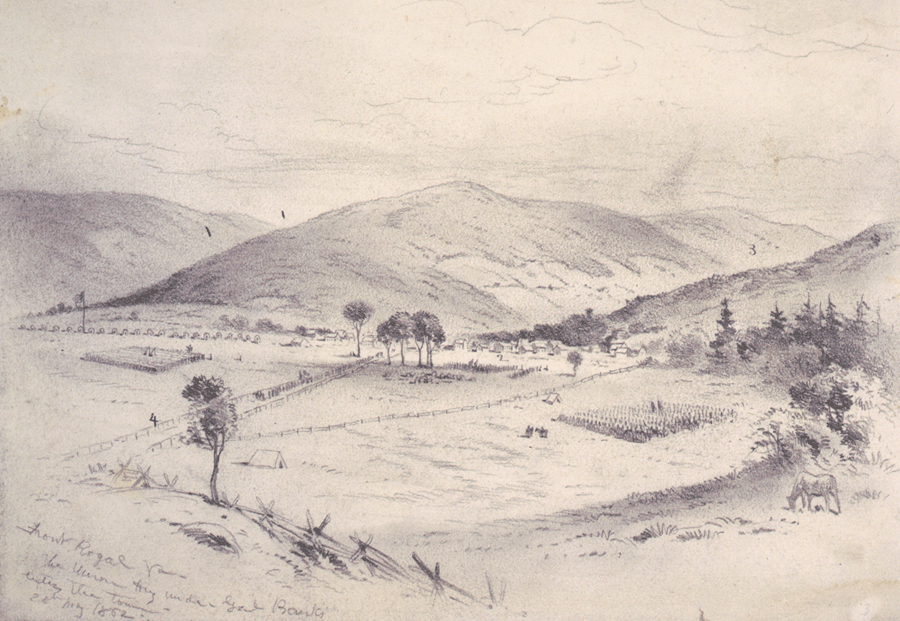
Front Royal Va.—The Union Army under Banks entering the town, drawing by Edwin Forbes

Early on May 23, Turner Ashby and a detachment of cavalry forded the South Fork of the Shenandoah River and rode northwest to capture a Union depot and railroad trestle at Buckton Station. Two companies of Union infantry defended the structures briefly, but the Confederates prevailed and burned the building, tore up railroad track, and cut the telegraph wires, isolating Front Royal from Banks at Strasburg. Meanwhile, Jackson led his infantry on a detour over a path named Gooney Manor Road to skirt the reach of Federal guns on his approach to Front Royal. From a ridge south of town, Jackson observed that the Federals were camped near the confluence of the South and North Forks and that they would have to cross two bridges in order to escape from his pending attack.

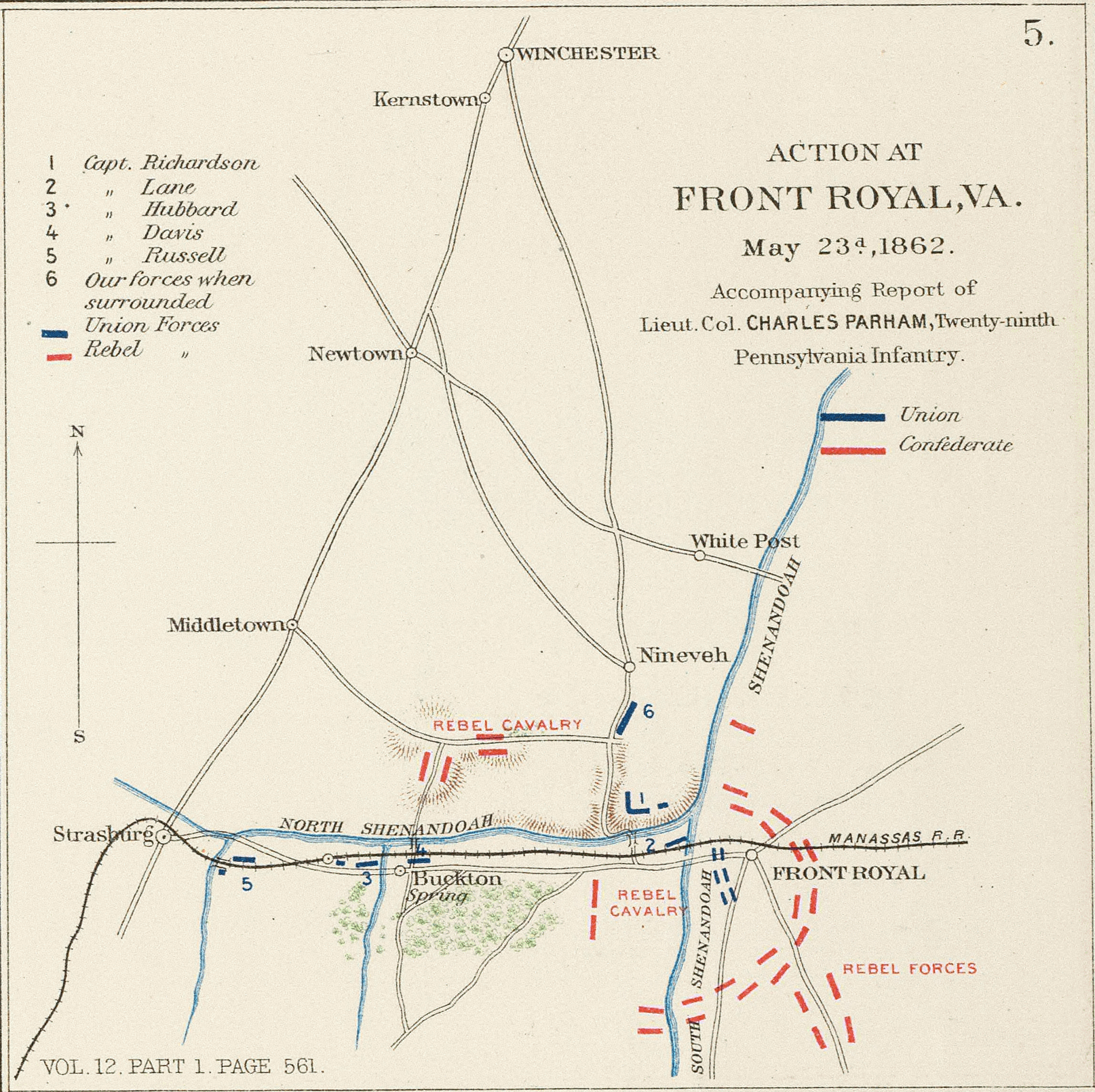
"Action at Front Royal, Va."

The center of Jackson's line of battle were the ferocious Louisiana Tigers battalion (150 men, part of Brig. Gen. Richard Taylor's brigade in Ewell's division), commanded by Col. Roberdeau Wheat, and the 1st Maryland Infantry, the latter bitter enemies of Kenly's Union 1st Maryland Infantry. The first shots were fired around 2 p.m. and the Confederates quickly pushed the small Federal detachment out of town. Kenly and his men made a stand on a hill just north of town and Jackson prepared to charge them with the Marylanders in the center and the Louisianians against their left flank. Before the attack could commence, Kenly saw Confederate cavalry approaching the bridges that he needed for his escape route and he immediately ordered his men to abandon their position. They first crossed the South Fork bridges and then the wooden Pike Bridge over the North Fork, which they set afire behind them. Taylor's Brigade raced in pursuit and Jackson ordered them to cross the burning bridge. As he saw the Federals escaping, Jackson was frustrated that he had no artillery to fire at them. His guns were delayed on the Gooney Manor Road detour route the infantry had taken and Ashby's cavalry had failed to deliver Jackson's orders for them to take the direct route after the battle started.

By God, sir, I will not retreat. We have more to fear from the opinions of our friends than the bayonets of our enemies.

— Maj. Gen. Nathaniel P. Banks, speaking to Col. George H. Gordon, May 24, 1862

A detachment of 250 Confederate cavalry under Col. Thomas S. Flournoy of the 6th Virginia Cavalry arrived at that moment and Jackson set them off in pursuit of Kenly. The retreating Union troops were forced to halt and make a stand at Cedarville. Although the cavalrymen were outnumbered three to one, they charged the Union line, which broke but reformed. A second charge routed the Union detachment. The results of the battle were lopsided. Union casualties were 773, of which 691 were captured. Confederate losses were 36 killed and wounded. Jackson's men captured about $300,000 of Federal supplies; Banks soon became known as "Commissary Banks" to the Confederates because of the many provisions they won from him during the campaign. Banks initially resisted the advice of his staff to withdraw, assuming the events at Front Royal were merely a diversion. As he came to realize that his position had been turned, at about 3 a.m. he ordered his sick and wounded to be sent from Strasburg to Winchester and his infantry began to march midmorning on May 24.

The most significant after effect of Banks's minor loss at Front Royal was a decision by Abraham Lincoln to redirect 20,000 men from the corps of Maj. Gen. Irvin McDowell to the Valley from their intended mission to reinforce George B. McClellan on the Peninsula. At 4 p.m. on May 24, he telegraphed to McClellan, "In consequence of General Banks's critical position I have been compelled to suspend General McDowell's movements to you. The enemy are making a desperate push upon Harper's Ferry, and we are trying to throw Frémont's force and part of McDowell's in their rear."

=== Winchester (May 25) ===
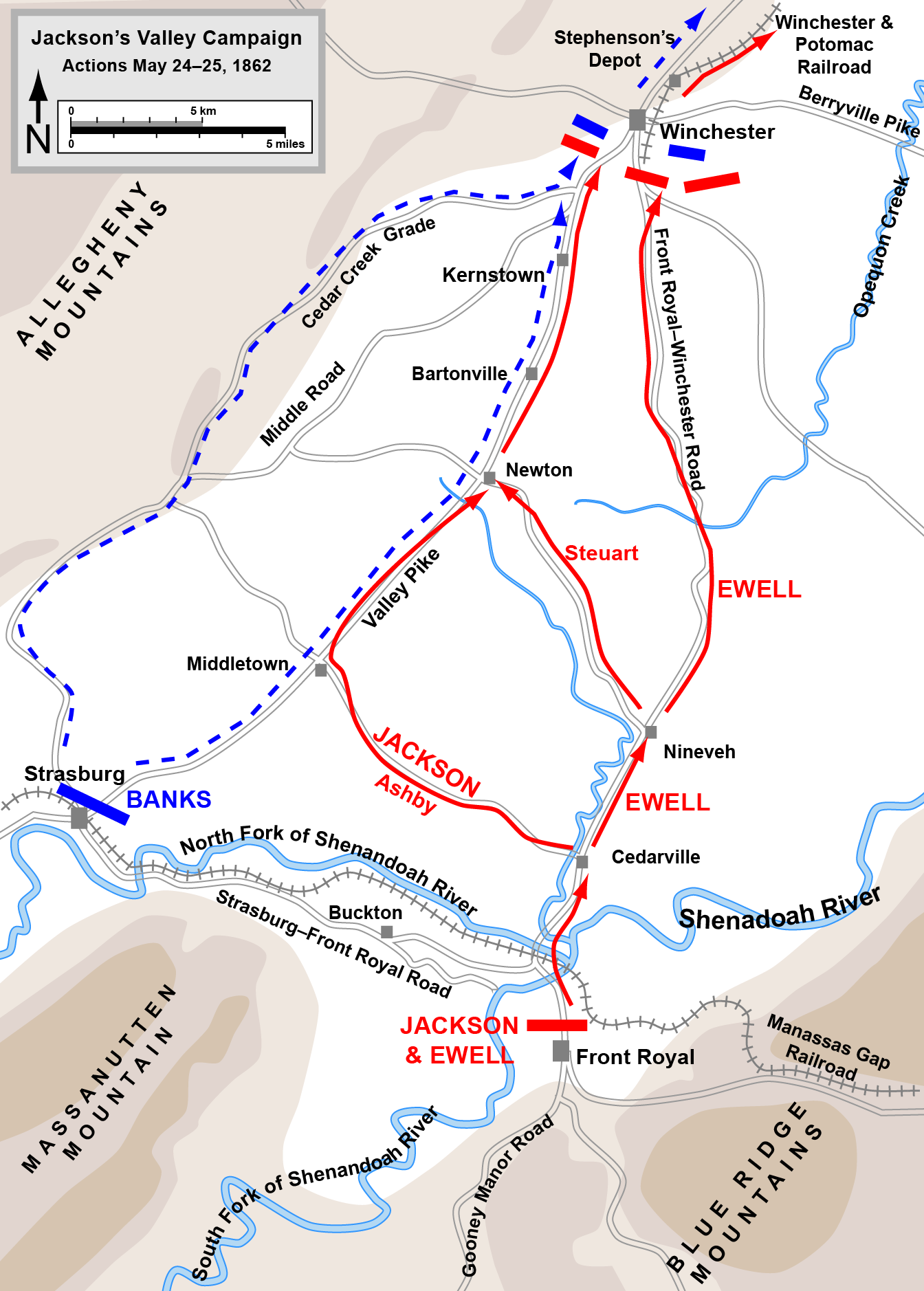
Actions from Front Royal to First Winchester, May 24–25, 1862

On May 24, Jackson planned to intercept Banks's retreating army, but it was not clear what route Banks would take. He could either march straight for Winchester or, if the Confederates abandoned Front Royal and raced to Winchester ahead of him, he could slip behind them and escape to the east over the Blue Ridge. Jackson decided to watch the road from Cedarville to Middletown. If Banks moved directly to Winchester, Jackson could hit him in his flank by using that road, but he deemed it unwise to commit his entire force from the Front Royal area until he could rule out the Blue Ridge escape possibility. He sent scouts from Turner Ashby's cavalry on the Strasburg–Front Royal Road and two regiments of cavalry from Ewell's division, commanded by Brig. Gen. George H. Steuart, to Newtown, hoping to intercept the vanguard of Banks's column. At the same time, he ordered Ewell to take the bulk of his division on the road to Winchester, but not to get too far away in case he had to be recalled. The remainder of Jackson's army moved north to Cedarville.

Receiving word from Steuart that the Federals had indeed begun a retreat down the Valley Pike, Jackson began directing forces to Middletown. Although they had to contend with Union cavalry (five companies of the 1st Maine and two companies of the 1st Vermont) and were thus delayed en route, they reached a rise outside of Middletown at about 3 p.m. and began artillery bombardments of the Union column. The chaos that this produced was exacerbated by a charge by the Louisiana Tigers, who began looting and pillaging in the wagon train. When Union artillery and infantry arrived to challenge Jackson at around 4 p.m, Richard Taylor's infantry turned to meet the threat while Jackson sent his artillery and cavalry north to harass the Union column ahead. By the time Taylor's attack started the Union troops had withdrawn and Jackson realized that it was merely the rearguard of Banks's column. He sent word to Ewell to move quickly to Winchester and deploy for an attack south of the town. Jackson's men began a pursuit down the Valley Pike, but they were dismayed to see that Ashby's cavalrymen had paused to loot the wagon train and many of them had become drunk from Federal whiskey. The pursuit continued long after dark and after 1 a.m., Jackson reluctantly agreed to allow his exhausted men to rest for two hours.

The enemy poured grape and musketry into Taylor's line as soon as it came in sight. Gen. Taylor rode in front of his brigade, drawn sword in hand, occasionally turning his horse, at other times merely turning in his saddle to see that his line was up. They marched up the hill in perfect order, not firing a shot! About half-way to the Yankees in a loud and commanding voice that I am sure the Yankees heard, he gave the order to charge!

— Rev. Major Robert L. Dabney, Jackson's chaplain

Jackson's troops were awakened at 4 a.m. on May 25 to fight the second Sunday battle of the campaign. Jackson was pleased to find during a personal reconnaissance that Banks had not properly secured a key ridge south of the town. He ordered Charles Winder's Stonewall Brigade to occupy the hill, which they did with little opposition, but they were soon subjected to punishing artillery and small arms fire from a second ridge to the southwest—Bower's Hill, the extreme right flank of the Federal line—and their attack stalled. Jackson ordered Taylor's Brigade to deploy to the west and the Louisianians conducted a strong charge against Bower's Hill, moving up the steep slope and over a stone wall. At the same time, Ewell's men were outflanking the extreme left of the Union line. The Union lines broke and the soldiers retreated through the streets of town. Jackson later wrote that Banks's troops "preserved their organization remarkably well" through the town. They did so under unusual pressure, as numerous civilians—primarily women—fired at the men and hurled objects from doorways and windows. Jackson was overcome with enthusiasm and rode cheering after the retreating enemy. When a staff officer protested that he was in an exposed position, Jackson shouted "Go back and tell the whole army to press forward to the Potomac!"

The Confederate pursuit was ineffective because Ashby had ordered his cavalry away from the mainstream to chase a Federal detachment. Jackson lamented, "Never was there such a chance for cavalry. Oh that my cavalry was in place!" The Federals fled relatively unimpeded for 35 miles in 14 hours, crossing the Potomac River into Williamsport, Maryland. Union casualties were 2,019 (62 killed, 243 wounded, and 1,714 missing or captured), Confederate losses were 400 (68 killed, 329 wounded, and 3 missing).

=== Union armies pursue Jackson ===
Word of Banks's ejection from the Valley caused consternation in Washington because of the possibility that the audacious Jackson might continue marching north and threaten the capital. President Lincoln, who in the absence of a general in chief was exerting day to day strategic control over his armies in the field, took aggressive action in response. Not yielding to panic and drawing troops in for the immediate defense of the capital, he planned an elaborate offensive. He ordered Frémont to march from Franklin to Harrisonburg to engage Jackson and Ewell, to "operate against the enemy in such a way as to relieve Banks." He also sent orders to McDowell at Fredericksburg:

You are instructed to lay aside for the present the movement on Richmond to put twenty thousand men in motion at once for the Shenandoah, moving on the line or in advance of the Manassas Gap Railroad. Your object will be to capture the forces of Jackson and Ewell, either in cooperation with General Frémont or in case want of supplies or of transportation interferes with his movement, it is believed that the force with which you move will be sufficient to accomplish the object alone.

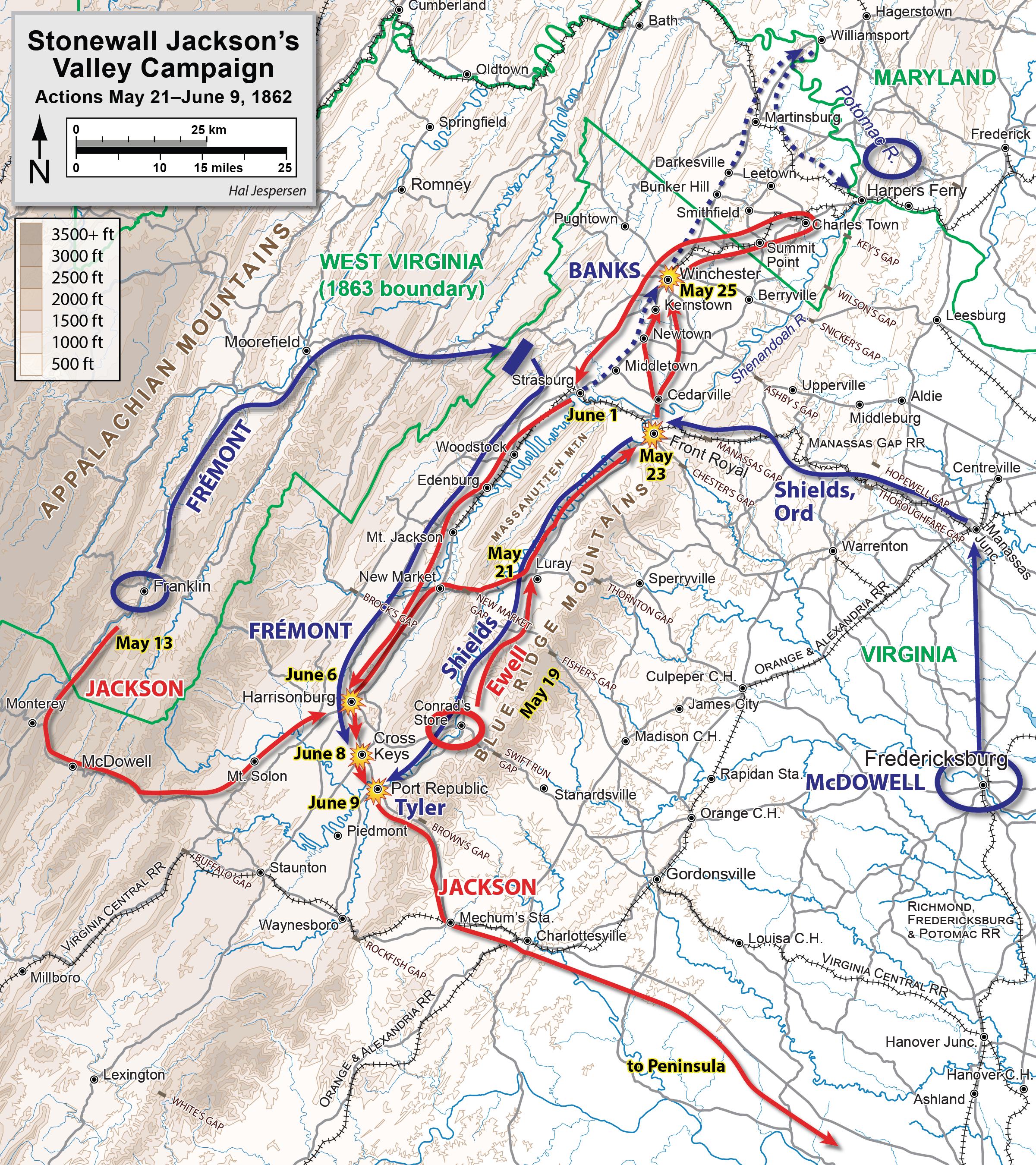
Front Royal (May 23) to Port Republic (June 9)

Lincoln's plan was to spring a trap on Jackson using three armies. Frémont's movement to Harrisonburg would place him on Jackson's supply line. Banks would recross the Potomac and pursue Jackson if he moved up the Valley. The detachment from McDowell's corps would move to Front Royal and be positioned to attack and pursue Jackson's column as it passed by, and then to crush Jackson's army against Frémont's position at Harrisonburg. Unfortunately for Lincoln, his plan was complex and required synchronized movements by separate commands. McDowell was unenthusiastic about his role, wishing to retain his original mission of marching against Richmond to support McClellan, but he sent the division of Brig. Gen. James Shields, recently arrived from Banks's army, marching back to the Valley, to be followed by a second division, commanded by Maj. Gen. Edward O. C. Ord. But Frémont was the real problem for Lincoln's plan. Rather than marching east to Harrisonburg as ordered, he took note of the exceptionally difficult road conditions on Lincoln's route and marched north to Moorefield. (He also was cognizant of the enormous area his department was required to defend and he was concerned about dividing his force and abandoning his subordinate, Brig. Gen. Jacob D. Cox, who had been attacked in southwestern Virginia on May 23.) But as a result, instead of a figurative hammer (Shields) striking at Jackson on an anvil (Frémont), all Lincoln could hope for would be a pincer movement catching Jackson at Strasburg, which would require intricate timing to succeed.

Jackson received word of Shields's return march on May 26, but he had been urged by Robert E. Lee to threaten the line of the Potomac. So while the bulk of his army camped near Charles Town, he ordered the Stonewall Brigade to demonstrate against Harpers Ferry on May 29–30. On May 30, Shields recaptured Front Royal and Jackson began moving his army back to Winchester. Lincoln's plan continued to unravel as Banks declared his army was too shaken to move in pursuit (and would remain north of the Potomac until June 10), Frémont moved slowly on poor roads (in contrast to Jackson, whose men had the advantage of the macadamized Valley Pike), and Shields would not leave Front Royal until Ord's division arrived. Jackson reached Strasburg before either of the Union armies and the only source of concern was that the Stonewall Brigade had been delayed at Harpers Ferry, but it caught up with the rest of Jackson's army after noon on June 1.

On June 2, Union forces pursued Jackson—McDowell up the Luray Valley and Frémont up the main Valley (west of Massanutten Mountain). Jackson's men made good time on the Valley Pike, marching more than 40 miles in one 36-hour period, but heavy rains and deep mud delayed their pursuers. For the next five days, frequent clashes occurred between Turner Ashby's cavalry (screening the rear of Jackson's march) and lead Union cavalry. Ashby also burned some bridges across the South Fork of the Shenandoah River, delaying the Union pursuit and keeping Shields's and Frémont's forces separated. When contact was reestablished on June 6, Ashby was killed on Chestnut Ridge near Harrisonburg in a skirmish with Frémont's cavalry, commanded by Brig. Gen. George D. Bayard. This was a significant loss for the Confederacy since Ashby (the "Black Knight") was one of its most promising cavalry generals (Ashby having been promoted to brigadier general on June 3). Jackson later wrote, "As a partisan officer, I never knew his superior."

As the two Union armies converged at the southwestern end of Massanutten Mountain, Jackson had the option of escaping through Brown's Gap towards Charlottesville and marching to Richmond, which was closely threatened by McClellan's army. However, he was determined to finish his work in the Valley by defeating the two opposing armies in detail. To accomplish this, he recognized that the small town of Port Republic would be crucial. If he could hold or destroy the bridges in this area at the confluence of the South River and North River with the South Fork of the Shenandoah River, he could prevent the two Union armies from combining against him. He positioned most of his army on the high ground overlooking the town from the south bank of the North River, from where his artillery could command the town and fords across the South River, preventing Shields from crossing. He deployed Ewell's division on a ridge about 7 miles north near the village of Cross Keys, ready to receive Frémont.

On June 7, Ewell maneuvered in an invitation for Frémont to attack him, but despite receiving a message from his colleague Shields, urging him to "thunder down on [Jackson's] rear," Frémont demurred in the face of Ewell's strong position. On Sunday, June 8, Jackson hoped to avoid a fight on the Sabbath, but a raid by Shields's cavalry, commanded by Col. Samuel S. Carroll, almost captured the Confederate trains in Port Republic and Jackson himself narrowly escaped by galloping over a bridge across the North River.

=== Cross Keys (June 8) ===
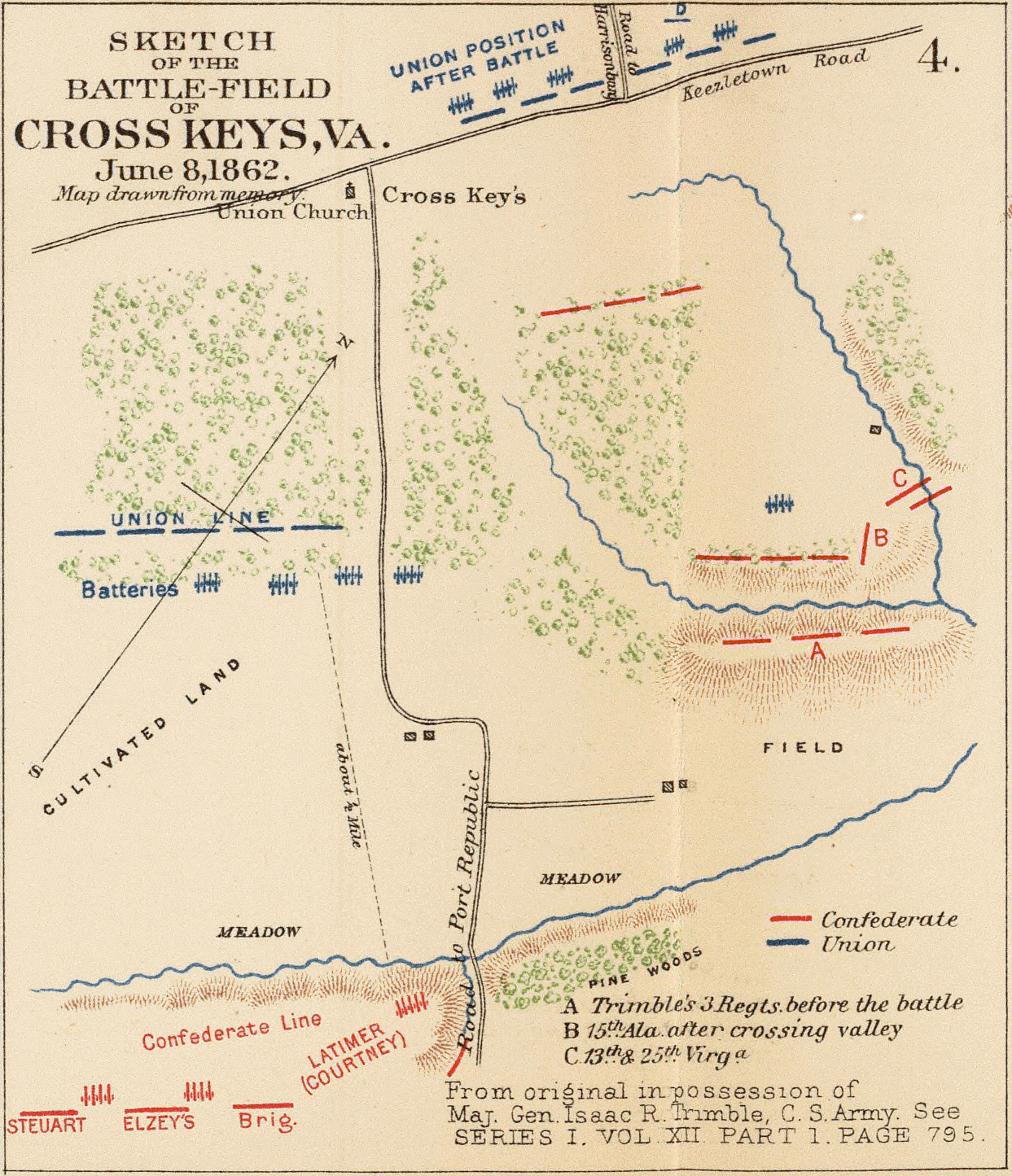
Sketch of the battle-field of Cross Keys, Va., June 8, 1862, Julius Bien & Co.

Frémont moved cautiously to approach Ewell's position on the morning of June 8, assuming that he was outnumbered, although he actually outnumbered the Confederates 11,500 to 5,800. (Richard Taylor's brigade was detached from Ewell's division for service with Jackson.) His men were held up by the determined skirmishers of the 15th Alabama Infantry for over an hour and he was unable to bring up his guns until 10 a.m. His opening artillery barrage was ineffective and did little more than alert Jackson at Port Republic that the battle had started. Frémont's men were arranged in a line running southwest to northeast on the Keezletown Road, facing Ewell's strong position about a mile south on a ridge behind Mill Creek, with both flanks anchored by dense woods. As they advanced, they wheeled left to become roughly parallel with the Confederate line. At about noon the Federal brigade on the left, commanded by Brig. Gen. Julius Stahel, chased a group of North Carolina skirmishers from Brig. Gen. Isaac R. Trimble's brigade across a clearing and up a hill, only to be surprised by a wave of musket fire. The 500 men of the 8th New York Infantry suffered nearly 50% casualties in the engagement.

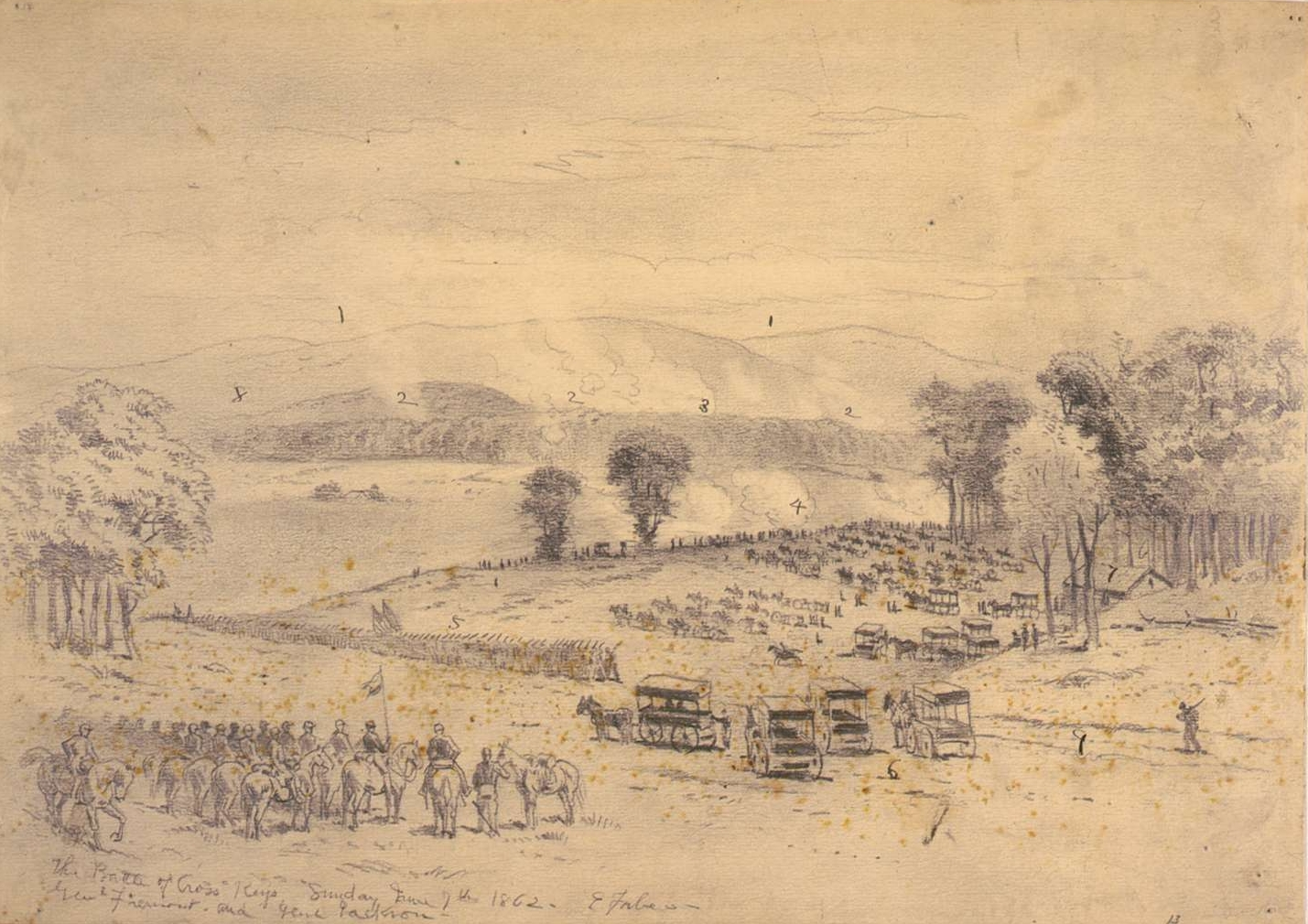
The battle of Cross Keys—Sunday June 7, 1862 [sic]—Genl. Fremont and Genl. Jackson, drawing by Edwin Forbes

By mid-afternoon, Frémont had sent only five of his 24 regiments into battle and Ewell expected another attack. The impatient Trimble launched his own offensive against a Union battery, which took his brigade a mile in advance of the rest of Ewell's division. He and his men sat there for the rest of the afternoon, inviting an attack that never came. As Frémont withdrew his men back to the Keezletown Road, Ewell decided against a counterattack, knowing that his force was seriously outnumbered. Trimble proposed the idea of a night attack to both Ewell and Jackson, but neither general agreed. The Confederates merely advanced to the previous Union position, ending a battle that, considering the percentage of troops engaged, was little more than a skirmish. Union casualties were 684, Confederate only 288, although two of Ewell's brigade commanders, Brig. Gens. Arnold Elzey and George H. Steuart, were badly wounded.

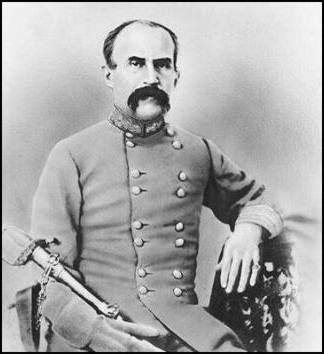
Brig. Gen. Isaac R. Trimble

Stonewall Jackson's plan for June 9 was to concentrate his forces and overwhelm the outnumbered Shields at Port Republic. He rightly assumed that Frémont would be too shaken to launch a major attack and that he could be held at bay with a mere token force, so he ordered the majority of Ewell's division to withdraw under the cover of darkness. They slipped away from Frémont and crossed the North River bridge. A hastily constructed bridge across the South River allowed the Confederates to move into the foggy, flat bottomland below the south bank of the South Fork of the Shenandoah River. The Stonewall Brigade led the advance on the road to Conrad's Store, the direction from which Shields would be approaching. Also that morning, Jackson ordered his trains to begin a march into Brown's Gap.

=== Port Republic (June 9) ===
Battle of Port Republic

Jackson learned at 7 a.m. that the Federals were approaching his column. Without proper reconnaissance or waiting for the bulk of his force to come up, he ordered Winder's Stonewall Brigade to charge through the thinning fog. The brigade was caught between artillery on its flank and rifle volleys to its front and fell back in disarray. They had run into two brigades at the vanguard of Shields's army, 3,000 men under Brig. Gen. Erastus B. Tyler. Attempting to extricate himself from a potential disaster, Jackson realized that the Union artillery fire was coming from a spur of the Blue Ridge that was known locally as the Coaling, where charcoal was made by a local family for their blacksmith shop. Jackson and Winder sent the 2nd and 4th Virginia Infantry regiments through the thick underbrush up the hill, where they encountered three Union infantry regiments supporting the artillery and were repulsed.

After his assault on the Coaling failed, Jackson ordered the rest of Ewell's division, primarily Trimble's brigade, to cross over the North River bridge and burn it behind them, keeping Frémont's men isolated to the north of the River. While he waited for these troops to arrive, Jackson reinforced his line with the 7th Louisiana Infantry of Taylor's brigade and ordered Taylor to make another attempt against the Union batteries. Winder perceived that the Federals were about to attack, so he ordered a preemptive charge, but in the face of point-blank volleys and running low on ammunition, the Stonewall Brigade was routed. At this point, Ewell arrived on the battlefield and ordered the 44th and 58th Virginia Infantry regiments to strike the left flank of the advancing Union battle line. Tyler's men fell back, but reorganized and drove Ewell's men into the forest south of the Coaling.

Taylor attacked the infantry and artillery on the Coaling three times before prevailing, but having achieved their objective, were faced by a new charge from three Ohio regiments. It was only the surprise appearance by Ewell's troops that convinced Tyler to withdraw his men. The Confederates began bombarding the Union troops on the flat lands, with Ewell himself gleefully manning one of the cannons. More Confederate reinforcements began to arrive, including the brigade of Brig. Gen. William B. Taliaferro, and the Union army reluctantly began to withdraw. Jackson remarked to Ewell, "General, he who does not see the hand of God in this is blind, sir, blind."

The impetuosity of Jackson had betrayed him into attacking before his troops were sufficiently massed, which was made difficult by the insufficient means of crossing the river.

— Brig. Gen. William B. Taliaferro

The Battle of Port Republic had been poorly managed by Jackson and was the most damaging to the Confederates in terms of casualties—816 against a force one half his size (about 6,000 to 3,500). Union casualties were 1,002, with a high percentage representing prisoners. Historian Peter Cozzens blames Jackson's piecemeal deployment of troops for his heavy losses and argues that it was a battle that did not need to have been fought—the Confederates could have easily burned the North River bridge and slipped into the Blue Ridge via Brown's Gap Turnpike without losses. Union soldiers were particularly upset with the performance of their commanders, Shields and Frémont, and both of their military careers faded. Frémont resigned his command just weeks later, rather than be subordinated to his rival Maj. Gen. John Pope. He resigned his commission in June 1864. Shields received no more combat assignments and resigned from the Army in March 1863.

== Aftermath ==
Jackson and his army, in one month, have routed Milroy—annihilated Banks—discomfited Frémont, and overthrown Shields! Was there ever such a series of victories won by an inferior force by dauntless courage and consummate generalship?

— "S" (anonymous newspaper correspondent), Richmond Whig, June 6, 1862

A star has arisen: his name [Stonewall], the haughty foe has found, to his cost, has been given prophetically, as he proved a wall of granite to them. For four weeks he has kept at bay more than one of the boasted armies."

— Diary of Confederate Army nurse, Kate Cummings

After Jackson's victories at Cross Keys and Port Republic, the Union forces withdrew. Frémont marched back to Harrisonburg, where he was frustrated to find orders from Lincoln he had not received in time, telling him not to advance beyond that town against Jackson. As the weather became clear, Jackson's cavalry under Col. Thomas T. Munford harassed Frémont's withdrawal, which reached Mount Jackson on June 11, and then unencumbered to Middletown on June 14 where he joined with Banks and Brig. Gen. Franz Sigel. Shields, who complained bitterly about the exhaustion of his division, marched slowly to Front Royal and on June 21 marched across the Blue Ridge to join Maj. Gen. Irvin McDowell.

Jackson sent messages to Richmond requesting that his force be augmented to 40,000 men so that he could assume the offensive down the Valley and across the Potomac. Lee sent him about 14,000 reinforcements, but then revealed his plan to call Jackson to Richmond to counterattack McClellan's Army of the Potomac and drive it away from Richmond. He needed all of the combat power he could muster and he wanted Jackson to attack the relatively unprotected right flank of McClellan's army, north of the Chickahominy River. Shortly after midnight on June 18, Jackson's men began to march toward the Virginia Peninsula. They fought with Lee in the Seven Days Battles, from June 25 to July 1. Jackson delivered an uncharacteristically lethargic performance in many of those battles, perhaps because of the physical strains of the Valley campaign and the exhausting march to Richmond.

With the success of his Valley campaign, Stonewall Jackson became the most celebrated soldier in the Confederacy (until his reputation was eventually eclipsed by Lee's), and his victories lifted the morale of the public. In a classic military campaign of surprise and maneuver, he pressed his army to travel 646 miles (1,040 km) in 48 days of marching and won five significant victories with a force of about 17,000 against a combined force of over 50,000 by attacking in detail making sure he had local numerical superiority. Jackson had accomplished his difficult mission, causing Washington to withhold over 40,000 troops from McClellan's offensive. Military historians Herman Hattaway and Archer Jones summarized a successful campaign:

Always outnumbered seven to three, every time Jackson engaged he fought with the odds of about four to three in his favor—because, moving rapidly on interior lines, he hit fractions of his enemy with the bulk of his own command. ... Jackson enjoyed the great advantage that the northerners remained widely scattered on a perimeter within which his troops could maneuver to concentrate against first one and then another of the Union forces. Lincoln managed very well, personally maneuvering the scattered Union armies. Since neither Lincoln nor his advisers felt that Jackson's small force could truly threaten Washington, they chose an offensive response as they sought to exploit their overwhelming forces and exterior position to overwhelm his army. But Jackson's great ability, celerity of movement, and successful series of small fights determined the outcome.

— Herman Hattaway and Archer Jones, How the North Won

On the Union side, a command shakeup resulted from the embarrassing defeat by a smaller force. McDowell's corps remained in the defense of Washington, with only one division (under Brig. Gen. George A. McCall) able to join McClellan on the Peninsula. Lincoln was disillusioned by the command difficulties of controlling multiple forces in this campaign and created a single new army, the Army of Virginia, under Maj. Gen. John Pope, incorporating the units of Banks, Frémont, McDowell, and several smaller ones from around Washington and western Virginia. This army was soundly defeated by Lee and Jackson in August at the Second Battle of Bull Run during the northern Virginia campaign.
