= David Stanton =

David Stanton may refer to:

- David L. Stanton (1840–1919), American Civil War general
- David Stanton (politician) (born 1957), Irish politician
- David Stanton (priest) (born 1960), British priest, Archdeacon of Westminster

== See also ==
- David Stanton Tappan (1845–1922), president of Miami University
- Dave Stanton, American motorcycle racer
