= David L. Stanton =

American general (1840–1919)

David Leroy Stanton
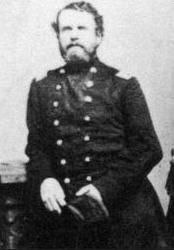
- Born: February 2, 1840; Baltimore, Maryland, U.S.
- Died: December 26, 1919 (aged 79); Baltimore, Maryland, U.S.
- Burial place: Loudon Park National Cemetery, Baltimore, Maryland, U.S.
- Spouse: Elizabeth Ann Hodson (m. 1865–1919)
- Military career
- Allegiance: United States (Union)
- Branch: United States Army (Union Army)
- Service years: 1861 – 1865
- Rank: Colonel; Bvt. Brigadier General
- Commands: 1st Maryland Infantry Regiment
- Conflicts: American Civil War: Jackson's Valley campaign; Battle of Front Royal; Overland Campaign; Harris Farm Engagement; Siege of Petersburg; Battle of Globe Tavern; Appomattox campaign; Battle of Five Forks

David Leroy Stanton (1840–1919) was an American Brevet Brigadier General who participated in the American Civil War. Stanton served in and commanded the 1st Maryland Infantry Regiment in the final months of the war, being brevetted for his services at the Battle of Five Forks.

== Biography ==
Stanton was born on February 2, 1840, in Baltimore and spent his early life as a merchant. When the American Civil War broke out, Stanton enlisted in the Union Army on May 15, 1861, as a 1st Sergeant of the 1st Maryland Infantry Regiment by President Lincoln himself. being promoted to 2nd Lieutenant on November 1, 1861. After being promoted to 1st Lieutenant on December 12, 1862, Stanton was promoted to Captain of Company I on March 7, 1864. Around this time, Stanton participated at the Battle of Front Royal, the Harris Farm Engagement and the Battle of Globe Tavern. Stanton was promoted to Major on December 2, 1864, and promoted to Lieutenant Colonel on February 21, 1864. After being promoted to full Colonel on March 20, 1865, Stanton participated in the Appomattox campaign and was given command of the 2nd Brigade of the 2nd Division of the V Corps. During the Battle of Five Forks, Colonel Richard N. Bowerman was severely wounded during the battle and Stanton took charge of Bowerman's men for the rest of the battle. For his services in the battle, Stanton was brevetted Brigadier General on April 1, 1865, for "gallant conduct in the Battle of Five Forks, VA." with the brevetting confirmed in 1867.

== See also ==
- List of American Civil War brevet generals (Union)
