= Joseph Stewart (Medal of Honor) =

- Born: Ireland
- Military career
- Allegiance: United States
- Branch: (United States) Union Army
- Service years: 1864–1865
- Rank: Private
- Unit: 1st Maryland Infantry Regiment
- Conflicts: American Civil War; Battle of Five Forks
- Awards: Medal of Honor

Joseph Stewart or Stuart (fl. 1864–1865) was a Union Army soldier in the American Civil War who received the U.S. military's highest decoration, the Medal of Honor, for his actions at the Battle of Five Forks.

Born in Ireland, Stewart gave Baltimore, Maryland, as his home of record when he joined the U.S. Army on September 30, 1864. He served during the Civil War as a private in Company G of the 1st Maryland Infantry Regiment. At the Battle of Five Forks on April 1, 1865, Stewart captured a flag. For this action, he was awarded the Medal of Honor weeks later on April 27, 1865. His official citation reads simply: "Capture of flag." Stewart was discharged from the Army on June 3, 1865.

Stewart is one of the hundreds of Medal of Honor recipients who are considered "lost to history", as his place of burial and other biographical details are unknown.
