= 1st Maryland Infantry Regiment (Union) =

America Civil War military unit

1st Regiment Maryland Volunteer Infantry
- Active: May 16, 1861, to July 2, 1865
- Country: United States
- Allegiance: Union
- Branch: United States Army; Union Army
- Type: Infantry
- Size: 1,885
- Engagements: Battle of Front Royal; Battle of Winchester; Battle of Bristoe Station; Battle of Mine Run; Battle of the Wilderness; Battle of Spotsylvania Courthouse; Battle of North Anna; Battle of Totopotomoy Creek; Battle of Cold Harbor; Second Battle of Petersburg; Battle of Five Forks; Battle of Appomattox Court House

Commanders
- Notable commanders: John Reese Kenly; David L. Stanton

The 1st Regiment Maryland Volunteer Infantry was an infantry regiment that served in the Union Army during the American Civil War.

== Service ==
The 1st Maryland was organized at Baltimore, Maryland and 4 companies (A, B, C and D) were mustered into Union service on May 16, 1861. The regiment moved to Relay House on the Baltimore and Ohio Railroad where additional companies (E, F, G, H, I and K) were mustered between May 25 and May 27.

The regiment's first commanding officer was Colonel John Reese Kenly, a Baltimore attorney who had served in Mexican–American War as a major of volunteers. When Kenly was promoted to Brigadier Genreral in August 1862, the new regimental commander was Colonel David Leroy Stanton.

=== Battle of Front Royal ===
In March 1862 the 1st Maryland was assigned to Maj. Gen. Nathaniel Banks forces operating in the Shenandoah Valley. The regiment was stationed at Front Royal on May 23, 1862, when it was attacked by Maj. Gen. Stonewall Jackson's Army of the Valley. Surprised and outnumbered, the 1st Maryland put up a stubborn rearguard action during which Col. Kenly was wounded. Union casualties were 83 killed and wounded, and 691 captured. The prisoners were paroled in September 1862.

The battle is notable in that the Union 1st Maryland had been attacked by their fellow Marylanders, the Confederate 1st Maryland Infantry, CSA. After hours of desperate fighting the Southerners emerged victorious. When the prisoners were taken, many men recognized former friends and family. According to J. J. Goldsborough, who would go on to write the history the Maryland Line in the Confederate Army:

nearly all recognized old friends and acquaintances, whom they greeted cordially, and divided with them the rations which had just changed hands.

=== Medal of Honor recipients ===
- Abel G. Cadwallader

Rank and organization: Corporal, Company H, 1st Maryland Infantry.
Place and date: At Hatchers Run and Dabneys Mills, Va., 6 February 1865.
Entered service at:
Birth: Baltimore Md.
Date of issue: 5 January 1897.
Citation: Gallantly planted the colors on the enemy's works in advance of the arrival of his regiment.

- Joseph Stewart

Rank and organization: Private, Company G, 1st Maryland Infantry.
Place and date. At Five Forks, Va., 1 April 1865.
Entered service at:
Birth: Ireland.
Date of issue: 27 April 1865.
Citation. Capture of a rebel flag.

- William Taylor

Rank and organization: Sergeant & Second Lieutenant (Highest Rank: Captain).
Place and date: Front Royal & Weldon Railroad, VA
Entered service at: 27 May 1861
Birth: Washington, D.C.
Date of issue: 29 August 1864
Citation: "When a sergeant at Front Royal, Va., he was painfully wounded while obeying an order to burn a bridge, but, persevering in the attempt, he burned the bridge and prevented its use by the enemy. Later, at Weldon Railroad, Va., then a lieutenant, he voluntarily took the place of a disabled officer and undertook a hazardous reconnaissance beyond the lines of the army; was taken prisoner in the attempt."

=== Losses ===
The 1st Maryland lost 8 officers and 110 enlisted men killed and mortally wounded, and 1 officer and 148 enlisted men to disease during its service.

== See also ==
- List of Maryland Union Civil War units

== Flags ==
The National flag of the regiment was made in San Francisco, California by Daniel Norcross. It was given to the unit in 1862. It featured a unique canton with 33 sliver stars surrounding a single golden star in the center most likely representing the state of Maryland. On one of the red stripes is the words: "Frist Infantry Maryland," embroidered in sliver in Chinese font. The names of the battles the regiment took part in were later added to the field.

While recruiting in the streets of Baltimore they hung a flag with the inscription "Recruiting office for the First Maryland Avengers.”
