= Valley District =

Organization if the U.S. Confederate Army

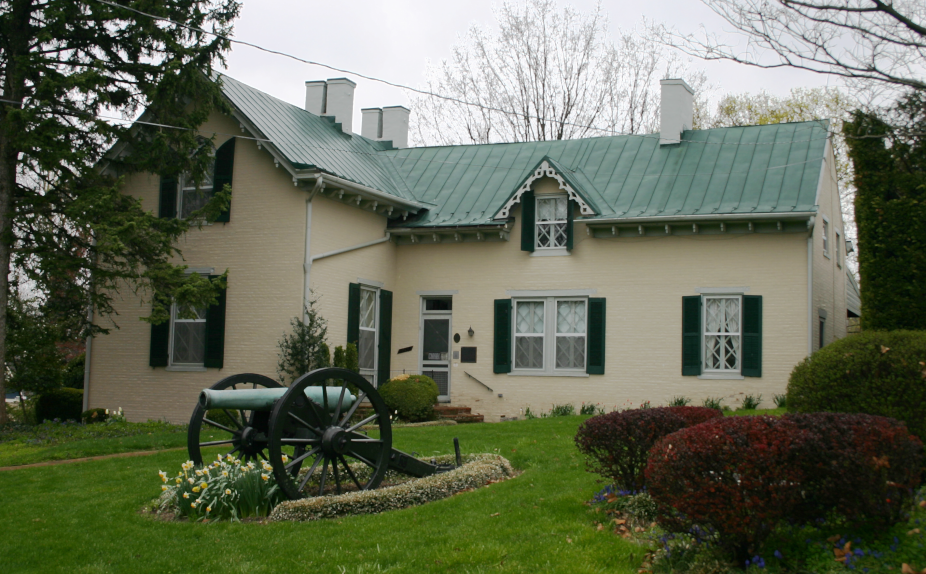
The Colonel Lewis T. Moore house in Winchester, Virginia, which served as the Valley District Headquarters of Lt. Gen. T. J. "Stonewall" Jackson (photo 2007).

The Valley District was an organization of the Confederate States Army and subsection of the Department of Northern Virginia during the American Civil War, responsible for operations between the Blue Ridge Mountains and Allegheny Mountains of Virginia. It was created on October 22, 1861, and was surrendered by the authority of Gen. Robert E. Lee at Appomattox Court House on April 9, 1865.

== Background ==
The Valley District was created to administer various home guard and military units and armies which operated in the Shenandoah Valley. The first forces organized in this area prior to the creation of the Valley District were the Forces In and About Harper's Ferry, Virginia, which existed from April 18, 1861, to June 15, 1861. The Forces In and About Harper's Ferry were originally under the Virginia State Militia, and were placed under three commanders during that time. Maj. Gen. Kenton Harper (Virginia State Militia) commanded from April 18 to April 28, then command fell to Col. Thomas J. "Stonewall" Jackson from April 28 to May 24, at which time J. E. B. Stuart was also appointed commander of the district's cavalry forces. Jackson and Stuart were then augmented from the Virginia militia to the Provisional Army of Virginia, before the entire command was then transferred to the Confederate States Army and Brig. Gen. Joseph E. Johnston on May 24, 1861.

From June 15 to October 22, military organization in the Shenandoah Valley came under local leadership until the creation of the Department of Northern Virginia, on October 22, 1861, as part of Johnston's prepared defenses in Northern Virginia. The Valley District was defined as the area between the Blue Ridge Mountains, the Alleghenies and extended south from the Potomac River to the vicinity of Staunton, Virginia and covered an area of roughly five thousand square miles.

Three districts were created under the Department of Northern Virginia were:

- The Aquia District
  - First commander: Maj. Gen. Theophilus H. Holmes
  - Period of existence: October 22, 1861 to April 18, 1862
- The Potomac District
  - First commander: Gen. Pierre G. T. Beauregard
  - Period of existence: October 22, 1861 to January 29, 1862
- The Valley District
  - First commander: Maj. Gen. Thomas J. "Stonewall" Jackson
  - Period of existence: October 22, 1861 to April 9, 1865,

While the Aquia and Potomac Districts ceased to exist by the spring of 1862, the need remained for military organization in the Valley throughout the remainder of the war.

== 1864 ==
During 1864, while under the command of Lt. Gen. Jubal Early, the Valley District operated its own independent army, the Army of the Valley, which was essentially composed of the Second Corps, Army of Northern Virginia. The Second Corps was detached from Lee's main army to invade, threaten and assault Washington, D.C., on the hopes of drawing forces away from Lt. General Ulysses S. Grant's forces, and thereby relieving pressure on his siege around Richmond, and Petersburg, Virginia.

== Command history ==
Commander	From	To
Maj. Gen. Thomas J. "Stonewall" Jackson	October 22, 1861	December 29, 1862
Brig. Gen. William E. "Grumble" Jones	December 29, 1862	May 28, 1863
Maj. Gen. Isaac R. Trimble	May 28, 1863	July 21, 1863
Brig. Gen. John D. Imboden	July 21, 1863	December 15, 1863
Maj. Gen. Jubal A. Early	December 15, 1863	March 9, 1864
Brig. Gen.John D. Imboden	March 9, 1864	May 4, 1864
Maj. Gen. John C. Breckinridge	May 4, 1864	June 13, 1864
Lt. Gen. Jubal A. Early	June 13, 1864	March 29, 1865
Maj. Gen. Lunsford L. Lomax	March 29, 1865	April 9, 1865

== See also ==
- Army of Northern Virginia
- Winchester in the American Civil War
- Stonewall Jackson's Headquarters Museum
- Army of the Valley
