= John Reese Kenly =

Union Army general

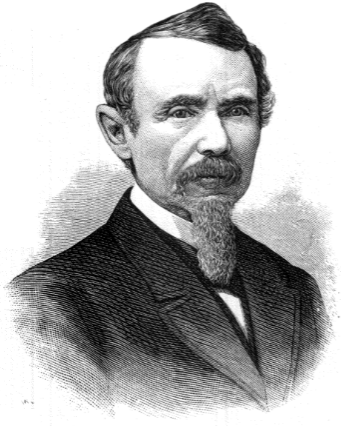
- Born: January 11, 1818; Baltimore, Maryland, U.S.
- Died: December 20, 1891 (aged 73); Baltimore, Maryland, U.S.
- Burial place: Green Mount Cemetery; Baltimore, Maryland, U.S.
- Military career
- Allegiance: United States of America; Union
- Branch: United States Army; Union Army
- Service years: 1846–1848, 1861–1865
- Rank: Brigadier General; Brevet Major General
- Commands: 1st Maryland Infantry Regiment; 3rd Division, I Corps; 3rd Brigade, Middle Department
- Conflicts: Mexican–American War; American Civil War; Battle of Front Royal; Battle of Harpers Ferry
- Other work: Lawyer

John Reese Kenly (January 11, 1818 – December 20, 1891) was an American lawyer, and a Union Army general in the American Civil War.

== Biography ==
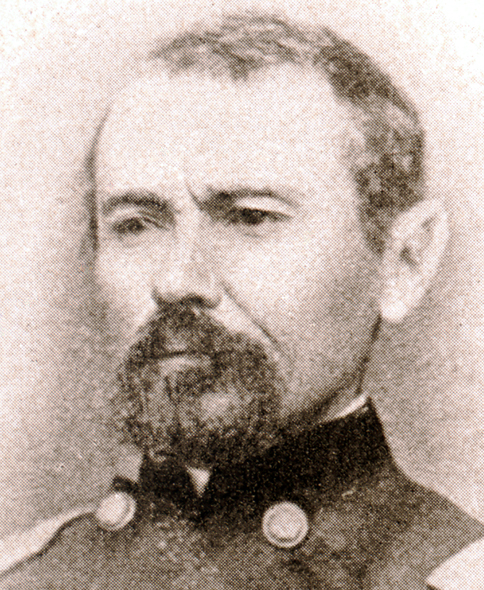
Brig. Gen. John Reese Kenly during the American Civil War.

Kenly was born in Baltimore, Maryland. He studied law and was admitted to the bar in 1845, but went to the Mexican–American War as a lieutenant with a company of volunteers he had raised and was later promoted to the rank of major.

As a captain he led a company in the Baltimore-Washington Battalion and wrote a book about his experiences, Memoirs of a Maryland Volunteer. The battalion was part of the division of David E. Twiggs's 1st Division. During the Battle of Monterrey on September 21–24, 1846, Kenly's battalion was involved in heavy fighting and Colonel William H. Watson was killed.

He entered the American Civil War as colonel of the 1st Maryland Infantry Regiment organized at Baltimore, Maryland, which was mustered into Union service on May 16, 1861. Together with some Pennsylvania companies, it was captured by Stonewall Jackson, after hard fighting, at Front Royal on the Shenandoah, May 23, 1862. Kenly himself was severely wounded when he was taken prisoner, but his stand had saved General Banks's division at Winchester, and he was raised to the command of a brigade in 1862, which he led at Hagerstown, Harpers Ferry, and elsewhere.

Kenly joined the Army of the Potomac after the Battle of Gettysburg and was assigned to I Corps during the Bristoe Campaign and the Battle of Mine Run, commanding the third division of the corps. Afterward, he was assigned to the Middle Department, commanding the Third Separate Brigade in 1864.

Kenly died of pneumonia on December 20, 1891, at his West Baltimore street in Baltimore, Maryland. He was buried in Baltimore's Green Mount Cemetery.

== See also ==
- List of American Civil War generals (Union)
