= National Register of Historic Places listings in Lexington, Virginia =

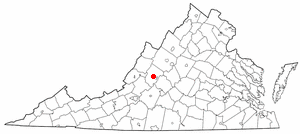
Location of Lexington in Virginia

This is a list of the National Register of Historic Places listings in Lexington, Virginia.

This is intended to be a complete list of the properties and districts on the National Register of Historic Places in the independent city of Lexington, Virginia, United States. The locations of National Register properties and districts for which the latitude and longitude coordinates are included below, may be seen in an online map.

There are 18 properties and districts listed on the National Register in the city, including 4 National Historic Landmarks.

This National Park Service list is complete through NPS recent listings posted June 20, 2025.

== Current listings ==
	Name on the Register	Image	Date listed	Location	Description
1	Alexander-Withrow House	Alexander-Withrow House	July 2, 1971 (#71001055)	Main and Washington Streets; 37°47′07″N 79°26′31″W	
2	Barracks, Virginia Military Institute	Barracks, Virginia Military Institute	October 15, 1966 (#66000956)	Northern edge of Lexington on U.S. Route 11; 37°47′26″N 79°26′06″W	
3	Blandome	Blandome	January 24, 2002 (#01001520)	101 Tucker St. 37°47′04″N 79°26′20″W	
4	Boude-Deaver House		March 9, 2023 (#100008650)	406 South Main St. 37°46′49″N 79°26′49″W	
5	Col Alto	Col Alto	November 19, 1990 (#89001925)	Nelson and Spottswood Dr. 37°46′49″N 79°26′19″W	
6	Lylburn Downing School	Lylburn Downing School	October 23, 2003 (#03001093)	300 Diamond St. 37°47′11″N 79°26′06″W	
7	First Baptist Church	First Baptist Church	August 30, 2006 (#06000757)	103 N. Main St. 37°47′10″N 79°26′26″W	
8	Stonewall Jackson House	Stonewall Jackson House	April 24, 1973 (#73002215)	8 E. Washington St. 37°47′05″N 79°26′29″W	
9	Jordan's Point Historic District	Jordan's Point Historic District	August 15, 2016 (#16000530)	Moses Mill Rd. and the confluence of the Maury River and Woods Creek; 37°47′32″N 79°25′47″W	
10	Lee Chapel, Washington and Lee University	Lee Chapel, Washington and Lee University	October 15, 1966 (#66000914)	Washington and Lee University campus 37°47′15″N 79°26′31″W	
11	Lexington and Covington Turnpike Toll House	Lexington and Covington Turnpike Toll House	November 27, 2004 (#04001268)	453 Lime Kiln Rd. 37°47′13″N 79°27′14″W	
12	Lexington Historic District	Lexington Historic District	July 26, 1972 (#72001506)	Roughly bounded by the former Chesapeake and Ohio Railway line, Graham and Jackson Aves., and Estill and Jordan Sts. 37°47′09″N 79°26′25″W	Includes several other listings, such as Washington and Lee University, Virginia Military Institute, Alexander-Withrow House, and Lexington Presbyterian Church
13	Lexington Presbyterian Church	Lexington Presbyterian Church	May 24, 1979 (#79003282)	Main and Nelson Streets; 37°47′02″N 79°26′34″W	
14	Mulberry Hill	Mulberry Hill	September 9, 1982 (#82004671)	Liberty Hall Rd. 37°47′25″N 79°26′59″W	
15	Reid-White-Philbin House	Reid-White-Philbin House	August 2, 2000 (#00000889)	208 W. Nelson St. 37°47′08″N 79°26′45″W	
16	Stono	Stono	April 1, 1975 (#75002112)	At the junction of U.S. Routes 11 and 11 Alt. 37°47′26″N 79°25′51″W	
17	Virginia Military Institute Historic District	Virginia Military Institute Historic District	May 30, 1974 (#74002219)	Virginia Military Institute campus 37°47′24″N 79°26′09″W	
18	Washington and Lee University Historic District	Washington and Lee University Historic District	November 11, 1971 (#71001047)	Washington and Lee University campus 37°47′17″N 79°26′33″W	

== See also ==
- List of National Historic Landmarks in Virginia
- National Register of Historic Places listings in Virginia
- National Register of Historic Places listings in Rockbridge County, Virginia
