= Poague =

Poague is a surname. Notable people with the surname include:

- Henry Poague (1889–1953), American football coach
- William T. Poague (1835–1914), American Civil War veteran
  - Poague House

== See also ==
- Margaret E. Poague House
