= Jordan's Point Historic District =

Historic district in Virginia, United States

- U.S. National Register of Historic Places
- U.S. Historic district
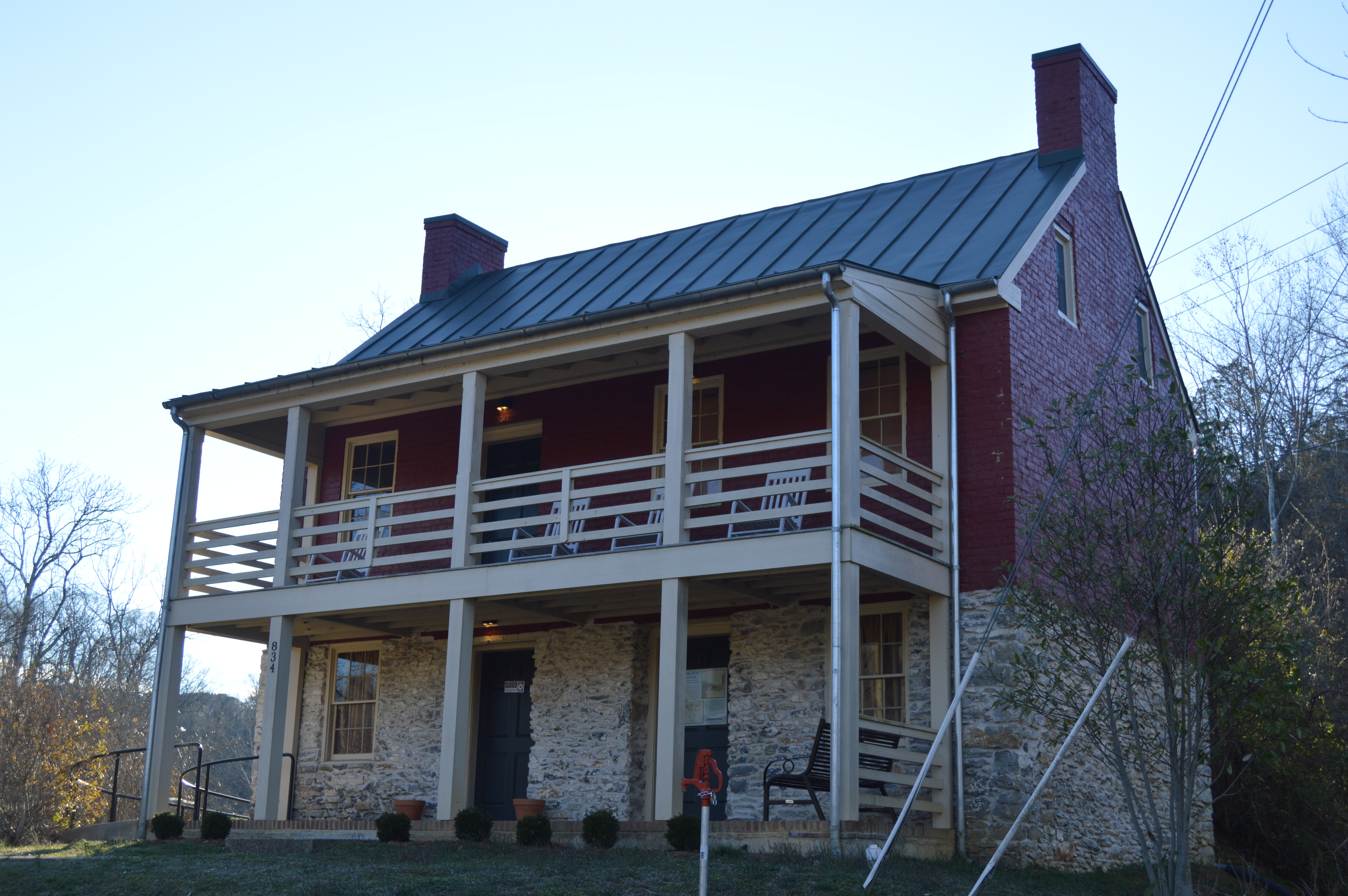
- Miller's house at Jordan's Point

- Location within Virginia Location within the United States
- Location: Moses Mill Rd. and the confluence of the Maury River and Woods Creek, Lexington, Virginia
- Coordinates: 37°47′32″N 79°25′47″W
- Area: 15 acres (6.1 ha)
- Built: 1800
- Built by: Jordan, John
- NRHP reference No.: 16000530
- Added to NRHP: August 15, 2016

The Jordan's Point Historic District encompasses a collection of historic industrial resources at Jordan's Point Park in Lexington, Virginia. The area, long a major local crossing point of the Maury River, was developed about 1800 by John Jordan and John Moorhead, who established a sawmill on the site. In 1806 they dammed the river, and then built a cotton mill in 1808. Of this and later industrial activity on the site, only foundation remnants and the millrace remain; surviving structures associated with the development include the miller's house (c. 1815), now a local museum, and a chapel built in 1874.

The district was listed on the National Register of Historic Places in 2016.

== See also ==
- National Register of Historic Places listings in Lexington, Virginia
