= Lexington and Covington Turnpike Toll House =

- U.S. National Register of Historic Places
- Virginia Landmarks Register
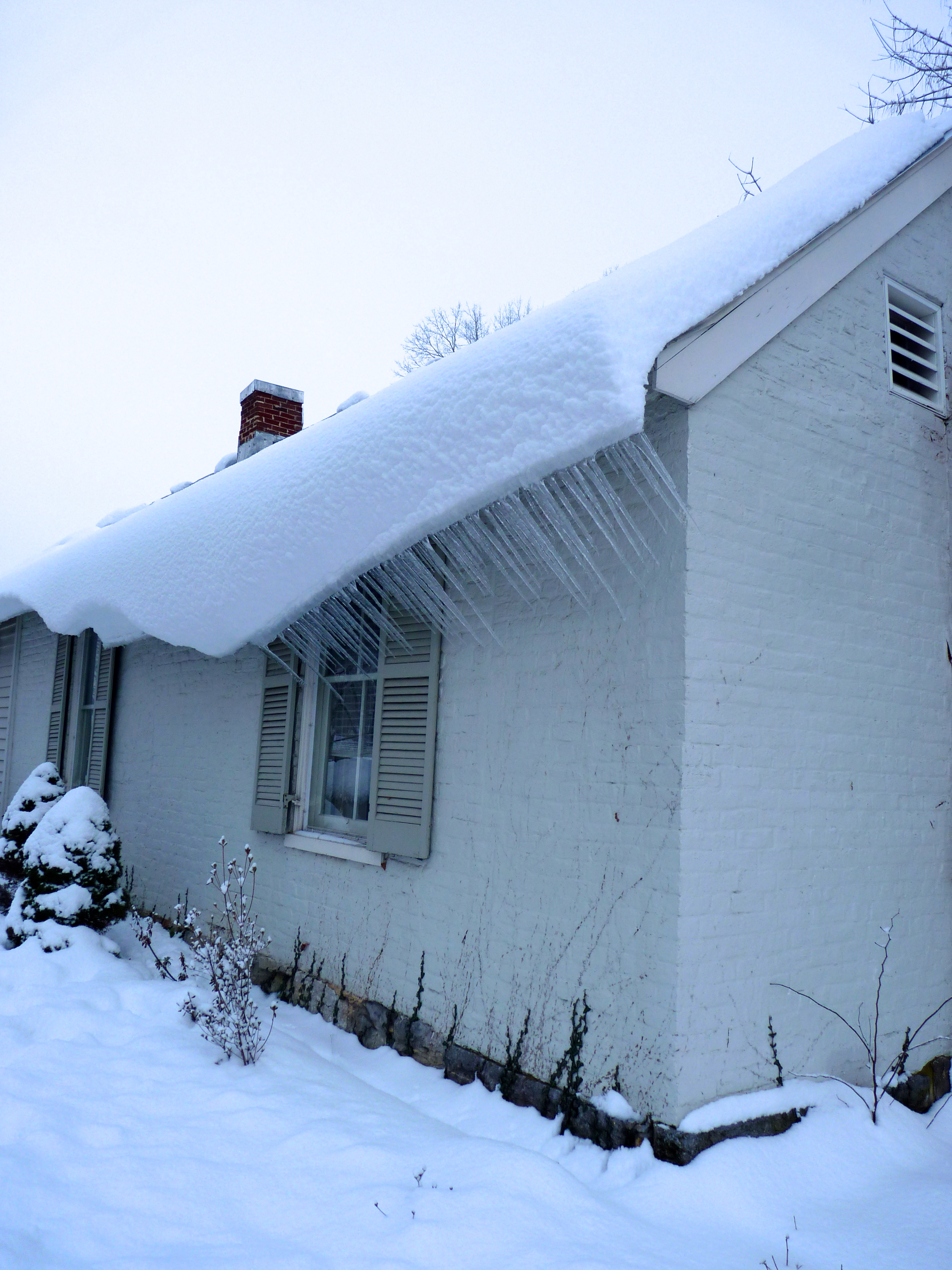
- The toll house during a snowstorm

- Location within Virginia Location within the United States
- Location: 453 Lime Kiln Rd., Lexington, Virginia
- Coordinates: 37°47′11″N 79°27′16″W
- Area: 0.4 acres (0.16 ha)
- Built: c. 1834, 1865-1867, 1887, 1904
- Built by: Tompkins, John Fulton
- Architectural style: Federal, Late Victorian
- NRHP reference No.: 04001268
- VLR No.: 117-0042

Significant dates
- Added to NRHP: November 27, 2004
- Designated VLR: September 8, 2004

Lexington and Covington Turnpike Toll House is a historic toll house located at Lexington, Virginia. The original section was built about 1834, as a two-room brick structure. A board-and-batten frame was added between 1865 and 1867. Two additional rooms were added to the original structure in the 1870s, forming a "U"-shape. In 1887, a Victorian style front porch was added to the original brick structure. The house was sheathed in weatherboard in 1904, and an addition filling in the "U" was added. The house was rehabilitated between 1997 and 2004. Also on the property are the contributing ruins of a spring house. The building housed a toll house into the 1850s, then became a dwelling.

It was listed on the National Register of Historic Places in 2004.
