= Stono =

Historic house in Virginia, United States

- U.S. National Register of Historic Places
- U.S. Historic district – Contributing property
- Virginia Landmarks Register
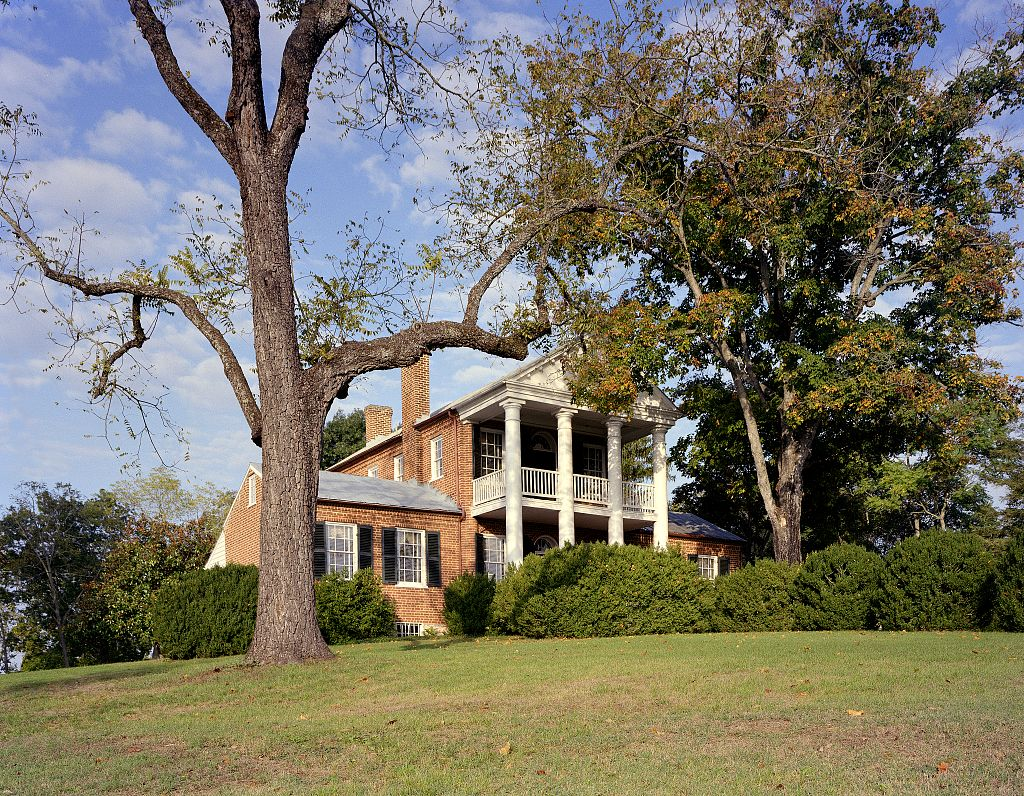
- Stono, September 2002

- Location within Virginia Location within the United States
- Location: At U.S. 11 and U.S. 11A, Lexington, Virginia
- Coordinates: 37°47′25″N 79°25′50″W
- Area: 6 acres (2.4 ha)
- Built: 1818
- Architect: Jordan, John
- NRHP reference No.: 75002112
- VLR No.: 117-0016

Significant dates
- Added to NRHP: April 1, 1975
- Designated VLR: December 17, 1974

Stono, also known as Jordan's Point (pronounced "Jer-don"), is a historic home located at Lexington, Virginia. It was built about 1818, and is a cruciform shaped brick dwelling consisting of a two-story, three-bay, central section with one-story, two-bay, flanking wings. The front facade features a two-story Roman Doric order portico with a modillioned pediment and lunette and a gallery at second-floor level. About 1870, a 1 1/2-story rear wing was added connecting the main house to a formerly separate loom house. Also on the property are a contributing summer kitchen, ice house, and office.

It was listed on the National Register of Historic Places in 1975. It is located in the Lexington Historic District.
