= Mountain View Farm (Lexington, Virginia) =

Historic house in Virginia, United States

- U.S. National Register of Historic Places
- Virginia Landmarks Register
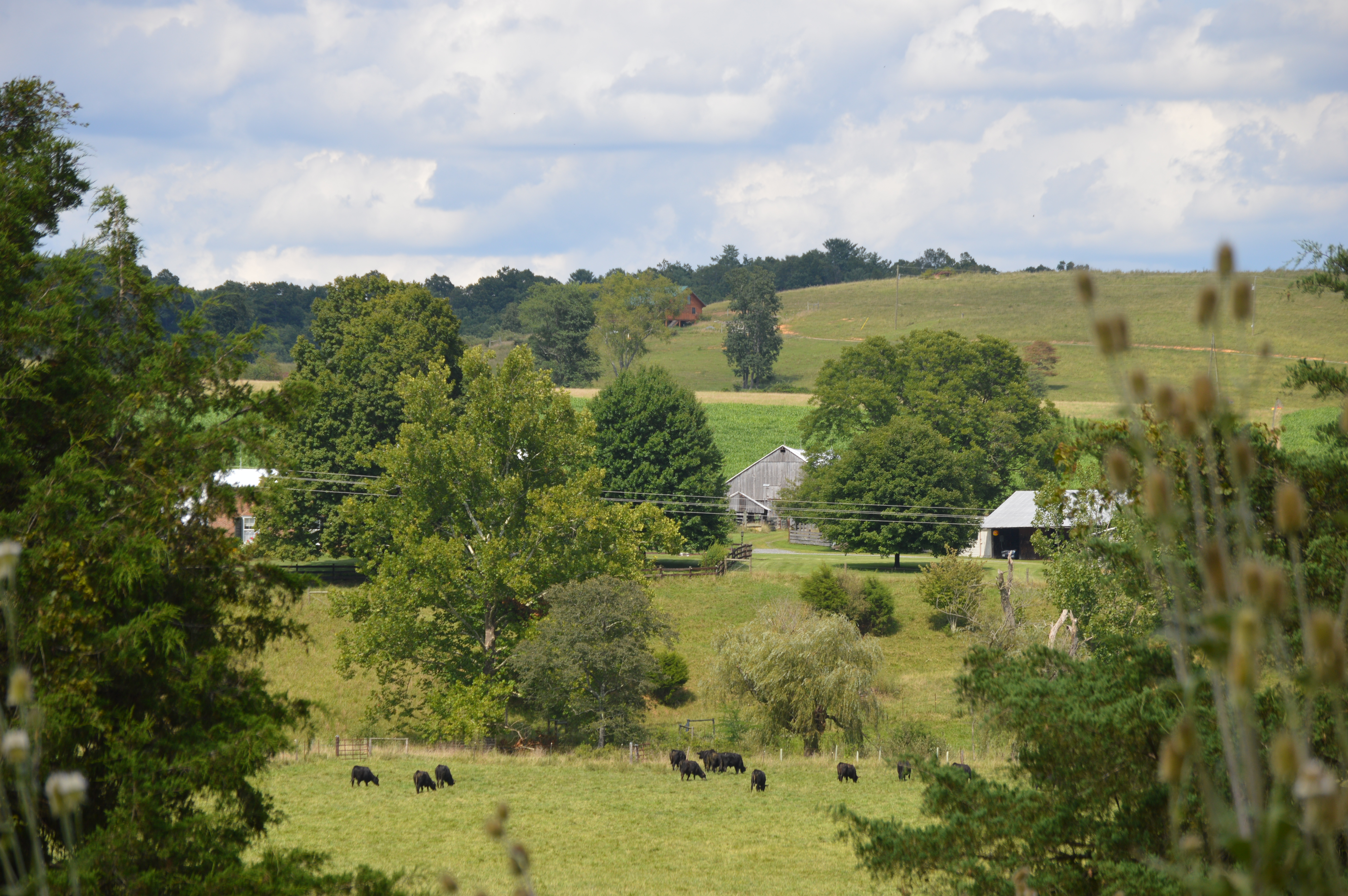
- Distant view from Interstate 64

- Location within Virginia Location within the United States
- Location: 199 Fredericksburg Rd., Lexington, Virginia
- Coordinates: 37°51′51″N 79°28′59″W
- Area: 133 acres (54 ha)
- Built: 1854
- Architectural style: Greek Revival
- NRHP reference No.: 99001723
- VLR No.: 081-0171

Significant dates
- Added to NRHP: January 27, 2000
- Designated VLR: September 15, 1999

Mountain View Farm, also known as Pioneer Farms, is a historic home and farm complex located near Lexington, Rockbridge County, Virginia. The main house was built in 1854, and is a two-story, three-bay, brick dwelling, with a 1 1/2-story gabled kitchen and servant's wing, and one-story front and back porches. It features a Greek Revival style interior and has a standing seam metal hipped roof. The property includes an additional 13 contributing buildings and 3 contributing structures loosely grouped into a domestic complex and two agricultural complexes. They include a two-story, frame spring house / wash house, a frame meathouse, a one-room brick building that probably served as a secondary dwelling, a double-crib log barn, a large multi-use frame barn, a slatted corn crib with side and central wagon bays and a large granary.

It was listed on the National Register of Historic Places in 2000.
