= Willson House =

Historic house in Virginia, United States

- U.S. National Register of Historic Places
- Virginia Landmarks Register
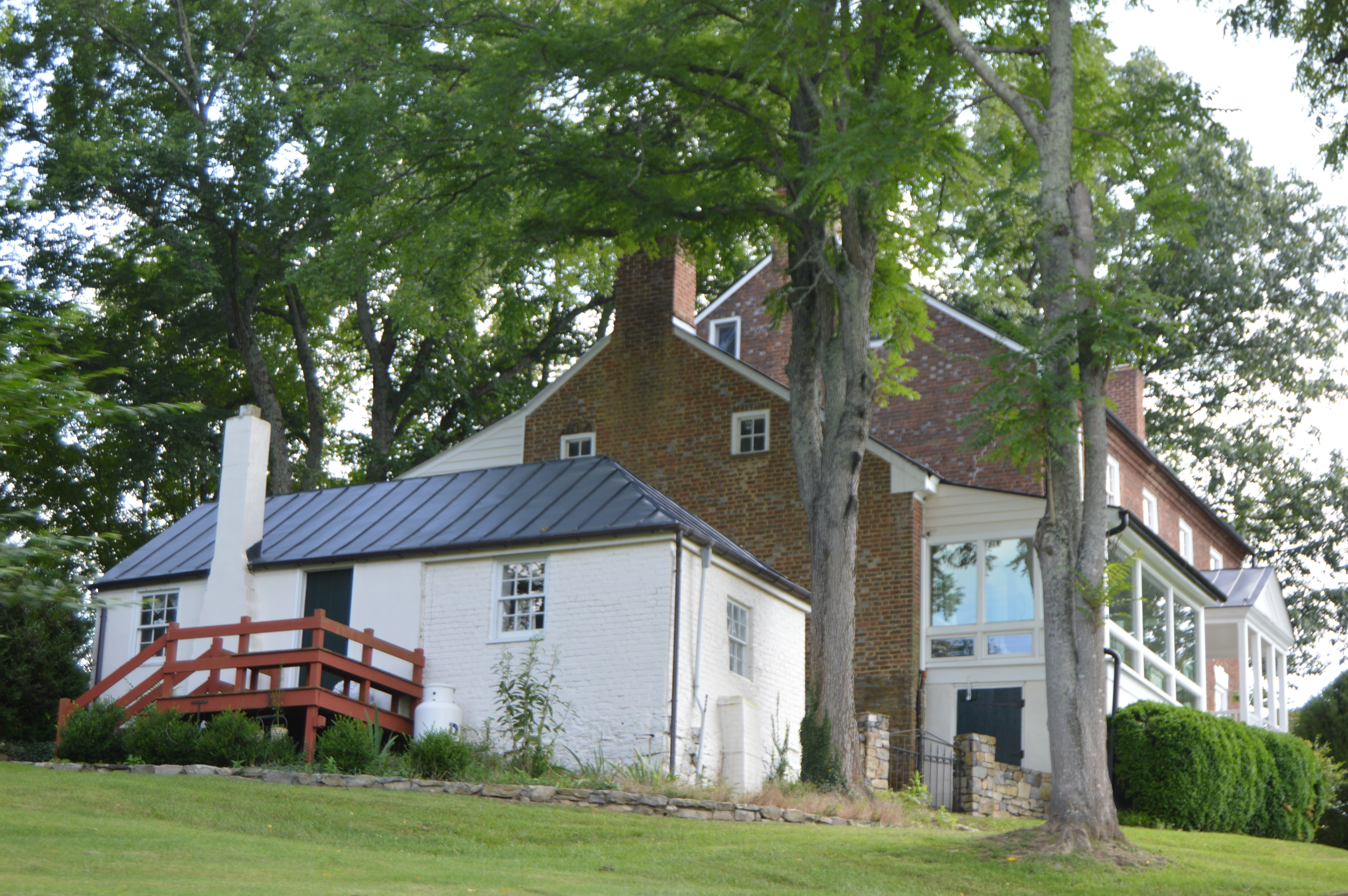
- Northern end and front

- Location within Virginia Location within the United States
- Location: 160 Kendal Dr., near Lexington, Virginia
- Coordinates: 37°47′55″N 79°30′24″W
- Area: 14.4 acres (5.8 ha)
- Built: 1812
- Architectural style: Georgian, Federal
- NRHP reference No.: 09001049
- VLR No.: 081-0183

Significant dates
- Added to NRHP: December 3, 2009
- Designated VLR: September 17, 2009

Willson House, also known as Tuckaway and Wee Dornoch, is a historic home located near Lexington, Rockbridge County, Virginia. It was built in 1812, and is a two-story, five-bay, Georgian / Federal style brick dwelling, with a one-story kitchen wing. It has a side gable roof, interior end chimneys, and a central-passage plan. The front facade features a pedimented entry porch with brown sandstone front steps. Also on the property are a contributing smokehouse and garage.

It was listed on the National Register of Historic Places in 2009.
