= Lexington Presbyterian Church =

Historic church in Virginia, US

- U.S. National Register of Historic Places
- U.S. Historic district – Contributing property
- Virginia Landmarks Register
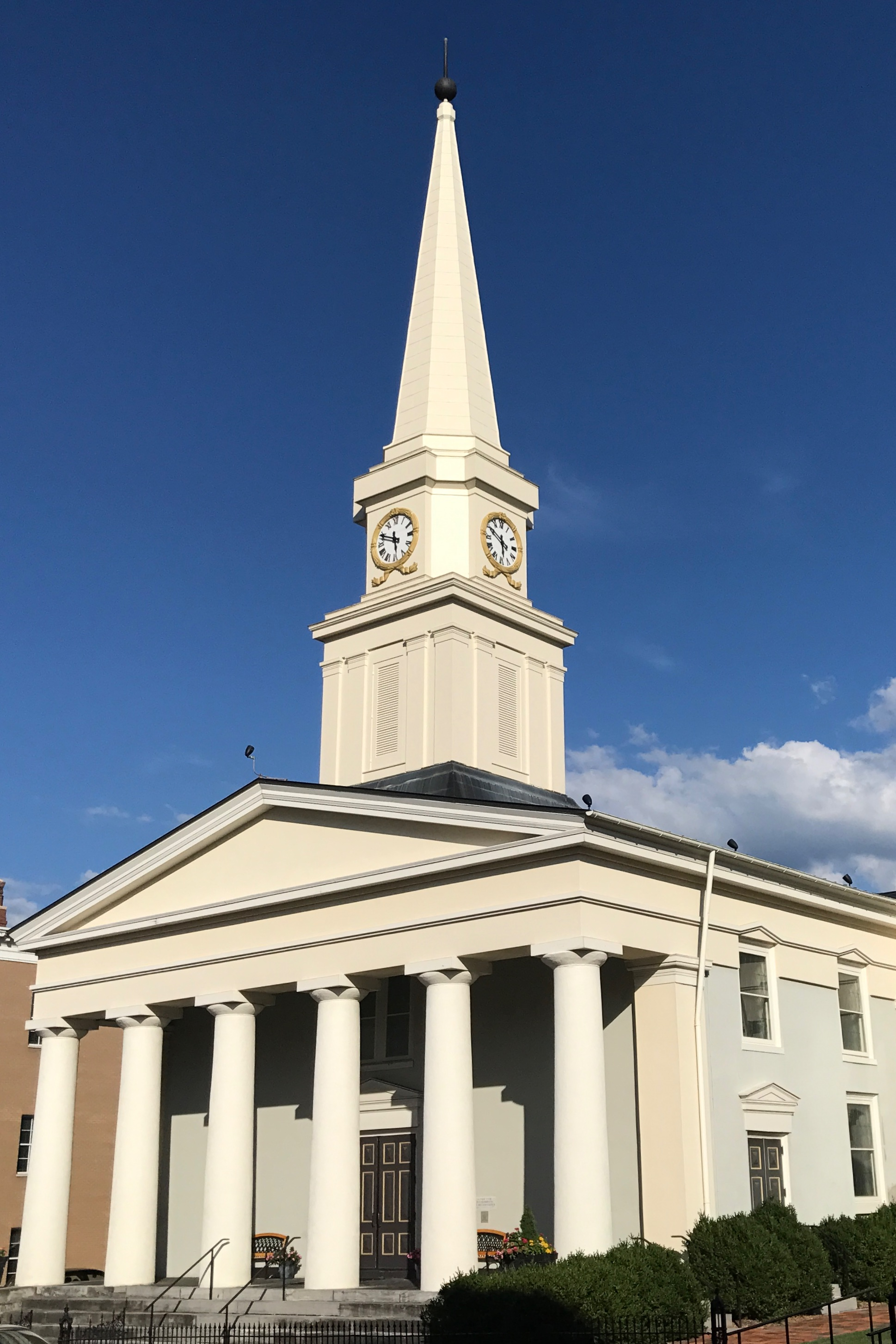
- View from South Main Street, 2017

- Location within Virginia Location within the United States
- Location: Main and Nelson Sts., Lexington, Virginia
- Coordinates: 37°47′2″N 79°26′35″W
- Area: 1.5 acres (0.61 ha)
- Built: 1843-1845, 1859, 1899, 1906
- Architect: Thomas Ustick Walter
- Architectural style: Greek Revival
- NRHP reference No.: 79003282
- VLR No.: 117-0012

Significant dates
- Added to NRHP: May 24, 1979
- Designated VLR: May 16, 1978

Lexington Presbyterian Church is a historic Presbyterian church building at Main and Nelson Streets in Lexington, Virginia. It was designed by architect Thomas U. Walter in 1843, and completed in 1845. A rear addition was built in 1859; stucco added in the 1880s; the building was renovated and enlarged in 1899; and the Sunday School wing was added in 1906. It is a monumental T-shaped, temple form stuccoed brick building in the Greek Revival style. The front facade features a Greek Doric pedimented peristyle portico consisting of six wooden columns and a full entablature. The building is topped by a tower with louvered belfry and spire.

Starting in 1851, Stonewall Jackson was a member of the church and taught Sunday school. In 1863 he was buried in the church's cemetery which is now named for him.

It was listed on the National Register of Historic Places in 1979. It is in the Lexington Historic District.
