= Sunnyside (Lexington, Virginia) =

Historic house in Virginia, United States

- U.S. National Register of Historic Places
- Virginia Landmarks Register
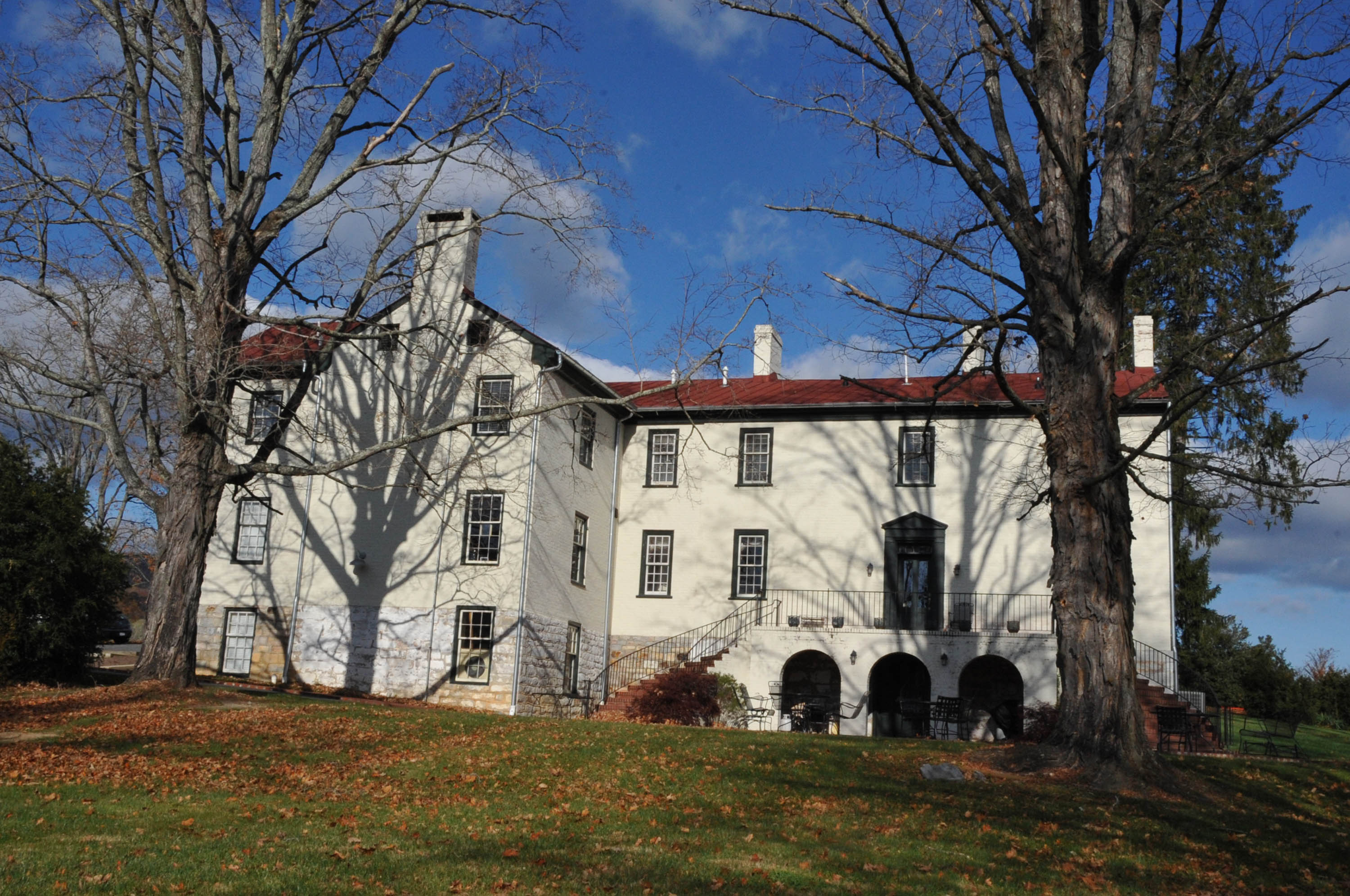

- Location within Virginia Location within the United States
- Location: 160 Kendal Dr., Lexington, Virginia
- Coordinates: 37°46′47″N 79°27′39″W
- Area: 6.8 acres (2.8 ha)
- Built: c. 1790
- Architect: Ravenhorst, Henry
- Architectural style: Federal
- NRHP reference No.: 02001003
- VLR No.: 081-7066

Significant dates
- Added to NRHP: September 14, 2002
- Designated VLR: June 12, 2002

Sunnyside, also known as Sunnyside House, Sunnyside Farm, The Sycamores, and Telford, is a historic home located near Lexington, Rockbridge County, Virginia. The original section was built about 1790, and is a three-story, five-bay, Federal style brick dwelling. A rear wing was added about 1805, parlor addition in the 1840s, the east end addition in the 1860s, projecting gable windows in the 1880s-1890s, and the north and south porches in the 1940s. Also on the property are the contributing cottage (early-19th century), dairy, machine shed, granary, garage, calving barn, and shed.

It was listed on the National Register of Historic Places in 2002.

== Gallery ==
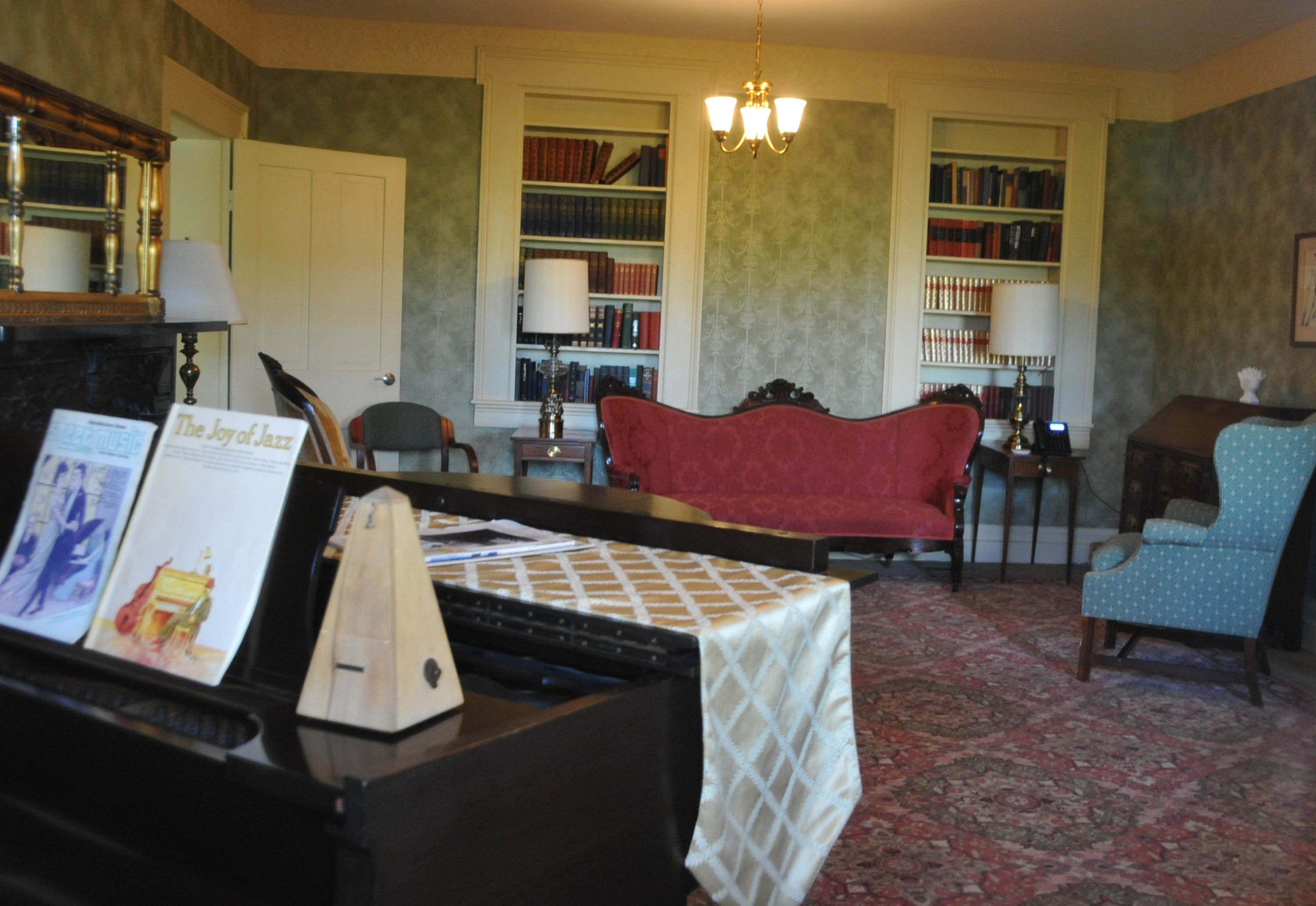

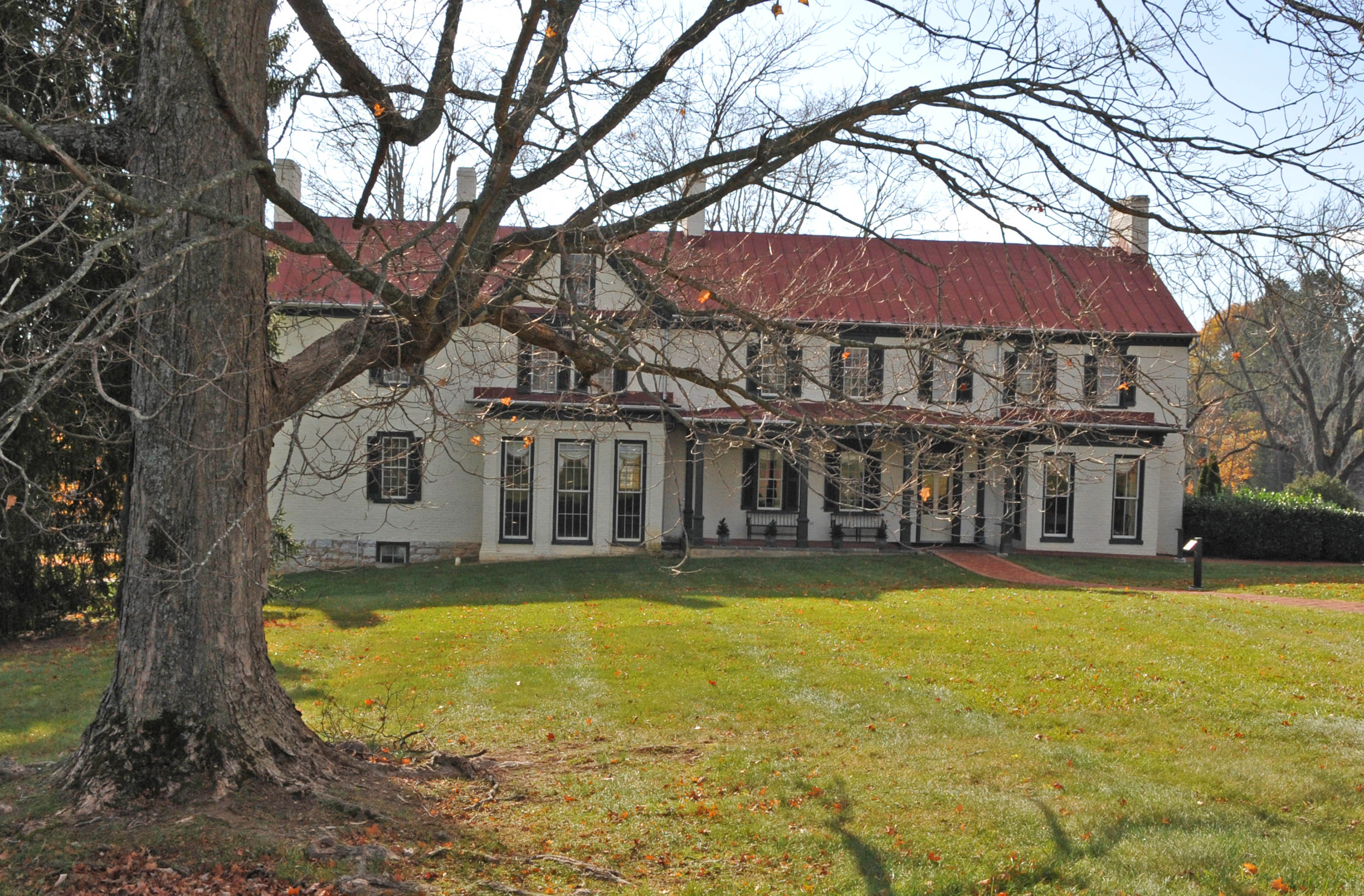
