= Stone House (Lexington, Virginia) =

Historic house in Virginia, United States

- U.S. National Register of Historic Places
- Virginia Landmarks Register
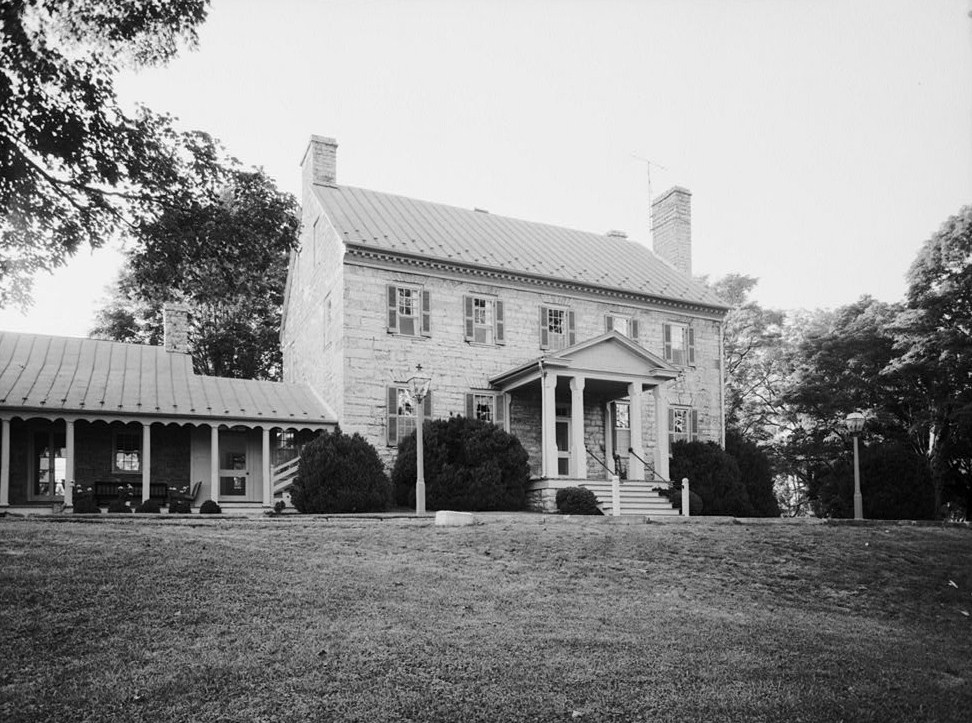
- Stone House, HABS Photo

- Location within Virginia Location within the United States
- Location: W of Lexington on Ross Rd., near Lexington, Virginia
- Coordinates: 37°46′32″N 79°27′34″W
- Area: 10 acres (4.0 ha)
- Built: 1797
- Built by: John Spear
- Architectural style: Early Stone Construction
- NRHP reference No.: 79003080
- VLR No.: 081-0168

Significant dates
- Added to NRHP: May 24, 1979
- Designated VLR: May 16, 1978

Stone House, also known as the Zachariah Johnson House, is a historic home located near Lexington, Rockbridge County, Virginia. It was built in 1797, and is a 2 1/2-story, five-bay, stone dwelling. It has a side-gable roof, interior end chimneys, and a central-hall-plan. The front facade features a rough-hewn, four columned portico with pediment.

It was listed on the National Register of Historic Places in 1979.
