= Springdale (Lexington, Virginia) =

Historic house in Virginia, United States

- U.S. National Register of Historic Places
- Virginia Landmarks Register
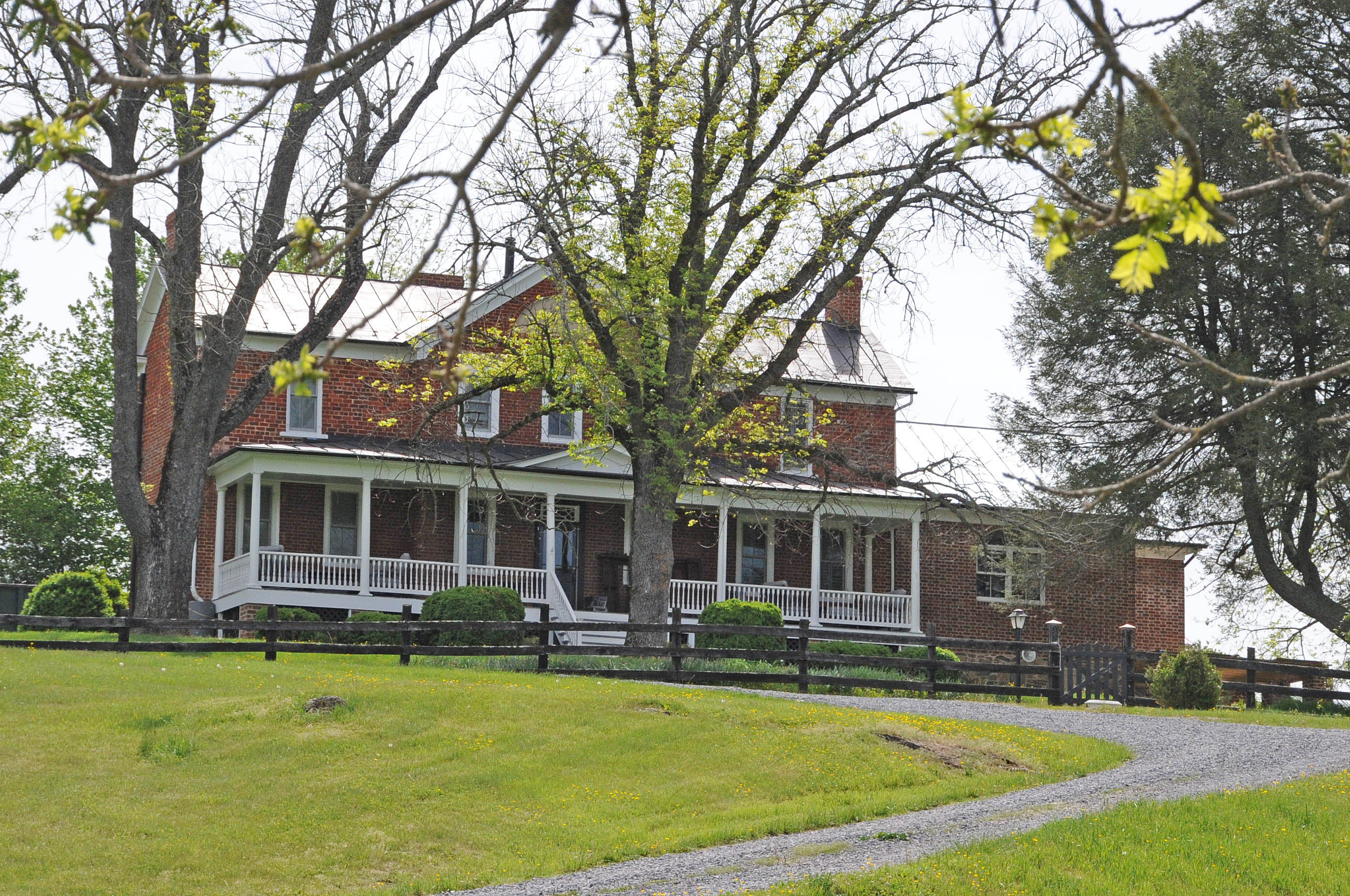

- Location within Virginia Location within the United States
- Location: 70 Gilmore Ln., Lexington, Virginia
- Coordinates: 37°44′31″N 79°25′11″W
- Area: less than one acre
- Built: c. 1812, 1914
- Built by: John Jordan
- Architectural style: Federal
- NRHP reference No.: 05001273
- VLR No.: 081-0180

Significant dates
- Added to NRHP: February 14, 2006
- Designated VLR: September 14, 2005

Springdale, also known as Half Moon, Alexander Trimble House, Holly Hill, and the Dixon House / Farm, is a historic home located near Lexington, Rockbridge County, Virginia. It was built about 1812, and reached its present form in 1914. The brick dwelling consists of a two-story, three-bay, pedimented, central section flanked by two-story wings. The interior features Federal style decorative details. The full-length front porch with a pediment above the front entrance replaced the original, smaller porch in 1914.

It was listed on the National Register of Historic Places in 2006.
