= Tankersley Tavern =

Historic commercial building in Virginia, United States

- U.S. National Register of Historic Places
- Virginia Landmarks Register
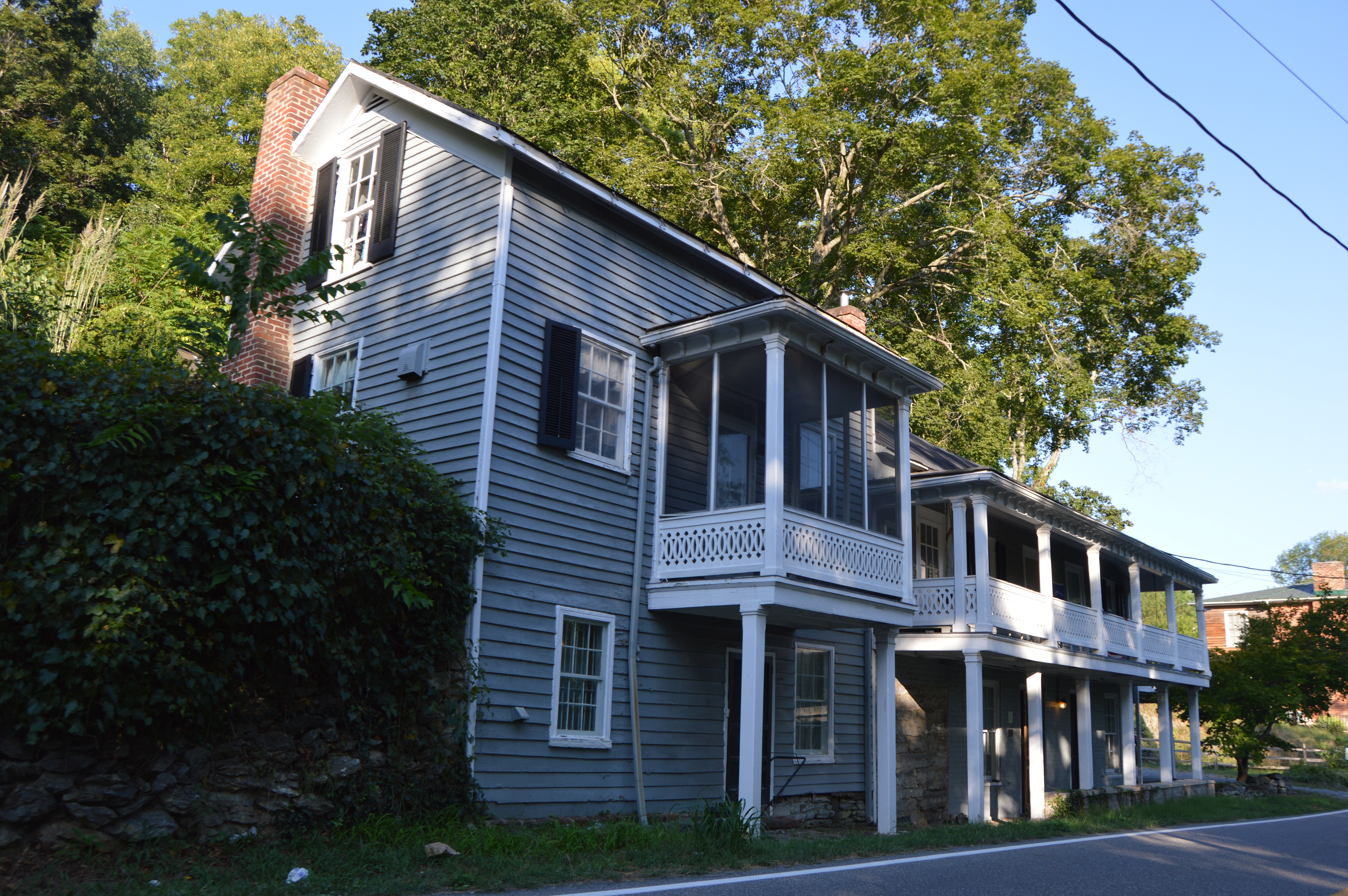
- Front and western end

- Location within Virginia Location within the United States
- Location: VA 631, near Lexington, Virginia
- Coordinates: 37°47′37.5″N 79°25′42″W
- Area: 2 acres (0.81 ha)
- Built: c. 1835
- Built by: John and Samuel Jordan
- NRHP reference No.: 88002179
- VLR No.: 081-0201

Significant dates
- Added to NRHP: November 3, 1988
- Designated VLR: April 21, 1987

Tankersley Tavern, also known as Old Bridge, is a historic building located near Lexington, Rockbridge County, Virginia. It was built in three sections with the oldest dated to about 1835. It is a two-story, nine-bay, single pile, frame building with an exposed basement and a decorative two-level gallery on the front facade. Also on the property are the contributing washhouse/kitchen, three frame sheds and a stone abutment for a bridge. It was originally built as a toll house (toll gate) at the county end of the bridge crossing the Maury River from the Valley Turnpike into Lexington. It later housed a tavern, canal ticket office, general store, post office, and dwelling.

It was listed on the National Register of Historic Places in 1988.
