= Hull's Drive In =

Drive-in movie theater in Lexington, Virginia, U.S.

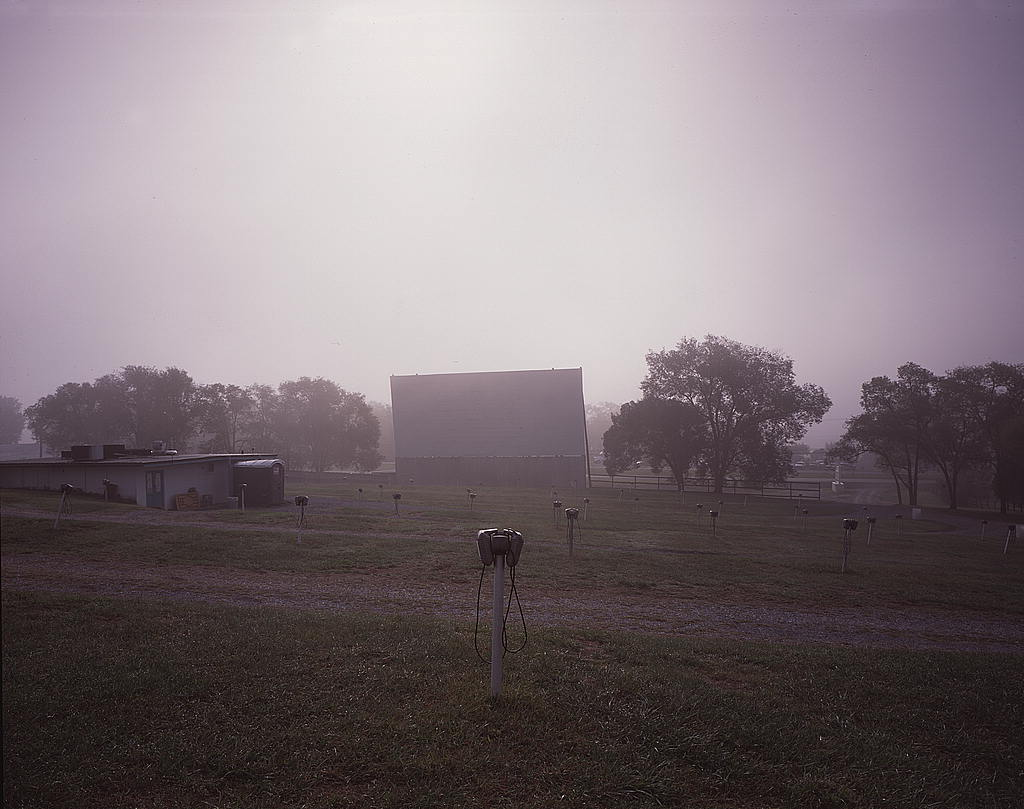
- Hull's Drive-In, September 2002
- Interactive map of Hull's Drive In
- Former names: Lee Drive-In
- Address: 2367 N. Lee Highway; Lexington, Virginia
- Location: United States
- Coordinates: 37.829085°N 79.382471°W
- Owner: Hull’s Angels, Inc. (a 501(c)(3) membership organization)
- Type: Not-for-profit drive-in theatre

Construction
- Opened: August 6, 1950

Website
- www.hullsdrivein.com

Hull's Drive In is a 319-space drive-in theatre in Lexington, Virginia, one of the seven drive-in theatres still currently operating in Virginia. It is one of only two non-profit drive-in theaters in the United States, the other being Warner's in nearby Franklin, West Virginia. It shows current, family-friendly movies every weekend (Friday-Sunday) between March and October.

== History ==
The theater opened on August 6, 1950, as the Lee Drive-In. Its owner was Mr. Waddey C. Watkins of Roanoke. In August 1957, Mr. Sebert Hull of Buena Vista assumed ownership. Mr. and Mrs. Hull ran the newly renamed Hull's Drive-In for the next four decades. When Mr. Hull died before the 1998 season, Mrs. Hull sold the business to Mr. W.D. Goad, whose auto body shop is adjacent to the drive-in on Route 11, north of Lexington. Thousands of movie fans were thrilled when Mr. Goad kept the drive-in going that summer, much the way Mr. Hull had for all the years before. The following season (1999), the high cost of the technical improvements that were needed discouraged Mr. Goad from opening the theater. That summer, the big screen remained dark as Mr. Goad searched for a buyer who could fund the necessary upgrades and run the business.

Relief came in the form of Hull's Angels, the local non-profit group dedicated to preserving Hull's Drive-In Theatre. Over the dark summer of 1999, the group formed and by that fall, agreed that they themselves should try and purchase the business. They organized formally as a non-profit corporation, and by spring 2000, signed a lease with an option to buy over the next two years. A $75,000 capital campaign followed, and by July, the Angels had raised enough money from around six hundred donors to make the urgent upgrades and repairs and reopen the theater for the balance of the summer.

2000 was the resurrected Hull's first full summer season, and in 2010, the drive-in marked its tenth year as one of America's only non-profit drive-in theater.

July 30, 2014, TripAdvisor.com voted Hull's Drive-In as the #7 top drive-in in the country as recognized by reviews on TripAdvisor.com.

== See also ==
- List of drive-in theaters
