= Hamilton Schoolhouse =

- U.S. National Register of Historic Places
- Virginia Landmarks Register
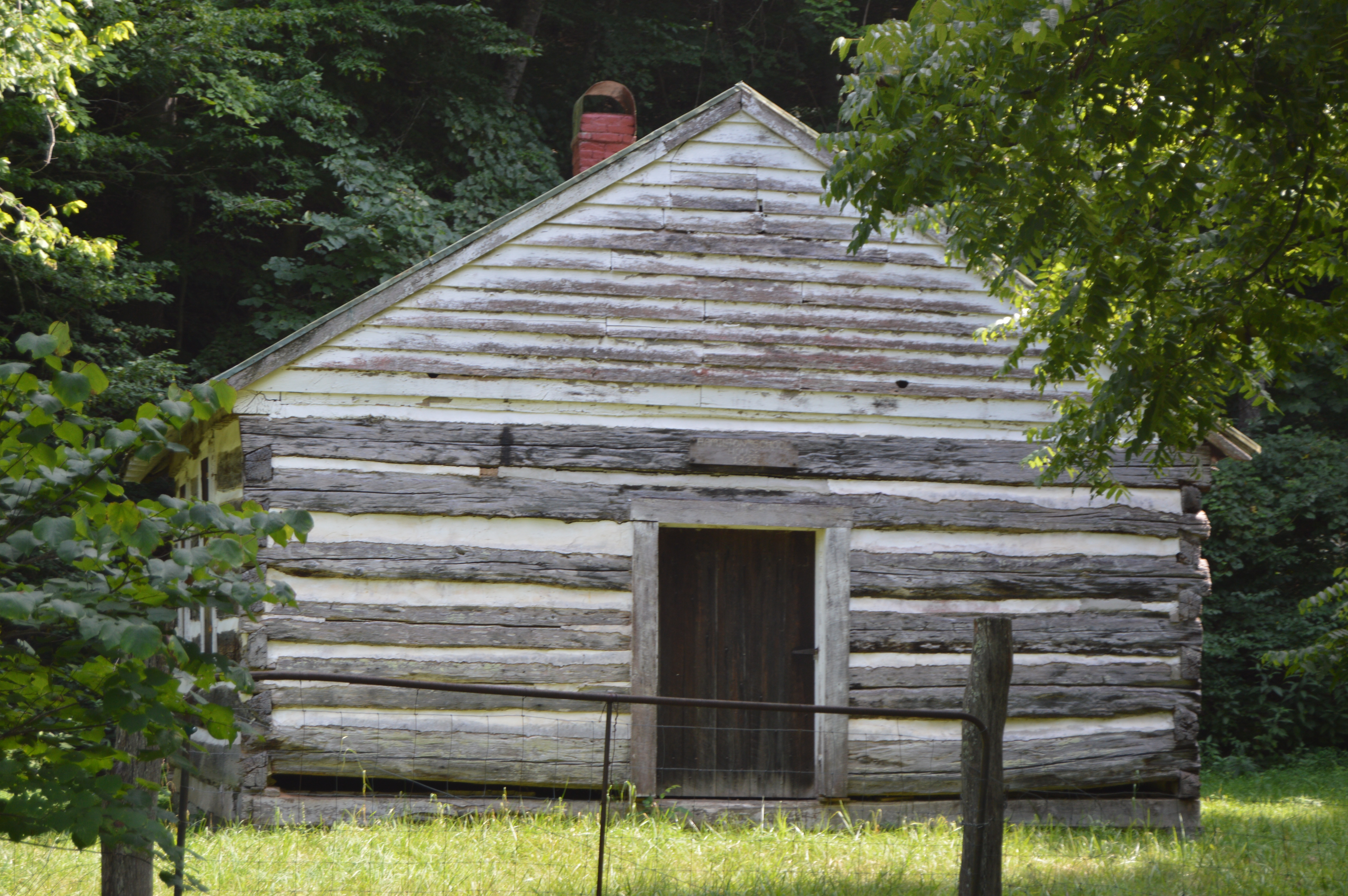
- Front of the school

- Location within Virginia Location within the United States
- Location: S. Buffalo Rd. near Lexington, Virginia
- Coordinates: 37°42′6″N 79°35′49″W
- Area: less than one acre
- Built: 1823
- Architectural style: Log Building
- NRHP reference No.: 02001372
- VLR No.: 081-0021

Significant dates
- Added to NRHP: November 21, 2002
- Designated VLR: September 11, 2002

Hamilton Schoolhouse is a historic one-room school building located near Lexington, Rockbridge County, Virginia. It was built in 1823, and is a one-story, one room log building measuring 22 feet by 24 feet. It was in use as a school until 1928, after which it was used as a community center.

It was listed on the National Register of Historic Places in 2002.
