= Thorn Hill =

Historic house in Virginia, United States

- U.S. National Register of Historic Places
- Virginia Landmarks Register
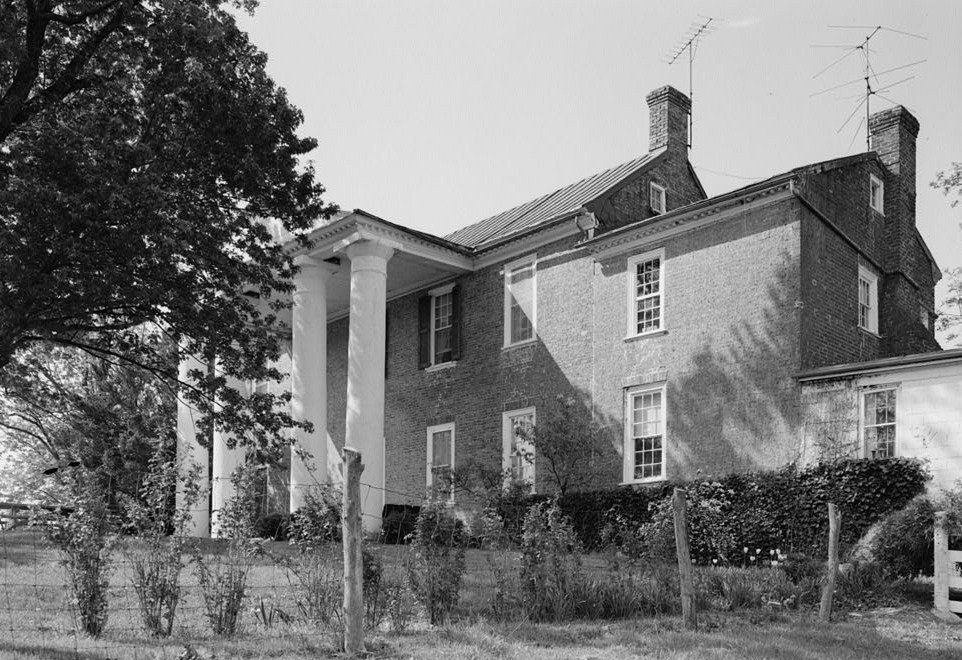
- Thorn Hill, HABS Photo

- Location within Virginia Location within the United States
- Location: SW of Lexington off VA 251, near Lexington, Virginia
- Coordinates: 37°45′50″N 79°28′11″W
- Area: 500 acres (200 ha)
- Built: 1792
- Architectural style: I House
- NRHP reference No.: 75002035
- VLR No.: 081-0084

Significant dates
- Added to NRHP: June 18, 1975
- Designated VLR: February 18, 1975

Thorn Hill is a historic home located near Lexington, Rockbridge County, Virginia. It was built in 1792, and is a two-story, five-bay, brick I-house dwelling. It has a side-gable roof, interior end chimneys with corbelled caps, and a two-story, one-bay wing. The front facade features a colossal tetrastyle portico with Doric order columns. The property includes the contributing log smokehouse, frame kitchen, frame servants house and loom house, and barns and farm outbuildings. Thorn Hill was the home of Col. John Bowyer, a central figure in Rockbridge County's formative years.

It was listed on the National Register of Historic Places in 1975.

The property has historically been closely associated with nearby Washington and Lee University (W&L). In 1782, Bowyer was appointed one of the first trustees of Liberty Hall Academy, which eventually became W&L. John Robinson, a principal benefactor of Washington College, and Judge John Brockenbrough, founder of the W&L Law School, lived at Thorn Hill. More recently, Thorn Hill was a dairy farm, and the house itself largely fell into disrepair.

In 2004, Bill Johnston and Paul Elliott bought Thorn Hill, spending more than $1 million restoring the property and adding various amenities, including a large pottery studio where the original kitchen (which was built away from the main house to prevent the main house from burning down in the event of a fire) once stood. They also added a scenic driveway and lush gardens. In 2008, the pair attempted to sell the property. Unfortunately the house went on the market the week before the collapse of Bear Stearns. Over the next several years, they kept cutting the price without attracting a buyer. In 2013, the owners decided to auction the house.

Current Washington and Lee Trustee Bennett L. Ross and his wife Alyson Moore Ross were the high bidders during the auction, stating that they "...were interested in buying Thorn Hill because of its ties to Washington and Lee."

In 2021, the owners formally opened a bed and breakfast called the "Thorn Hill Inn", featuring refurbished original outbuildings with modern amenities as well as a fitness and yoga center.
