= Alexander–Withrow House =

Historic house in Virginia, US

- U.S. National Register of Historic Places
- U.S. Historic district – Contributing property
- Virginia Landmarks Register
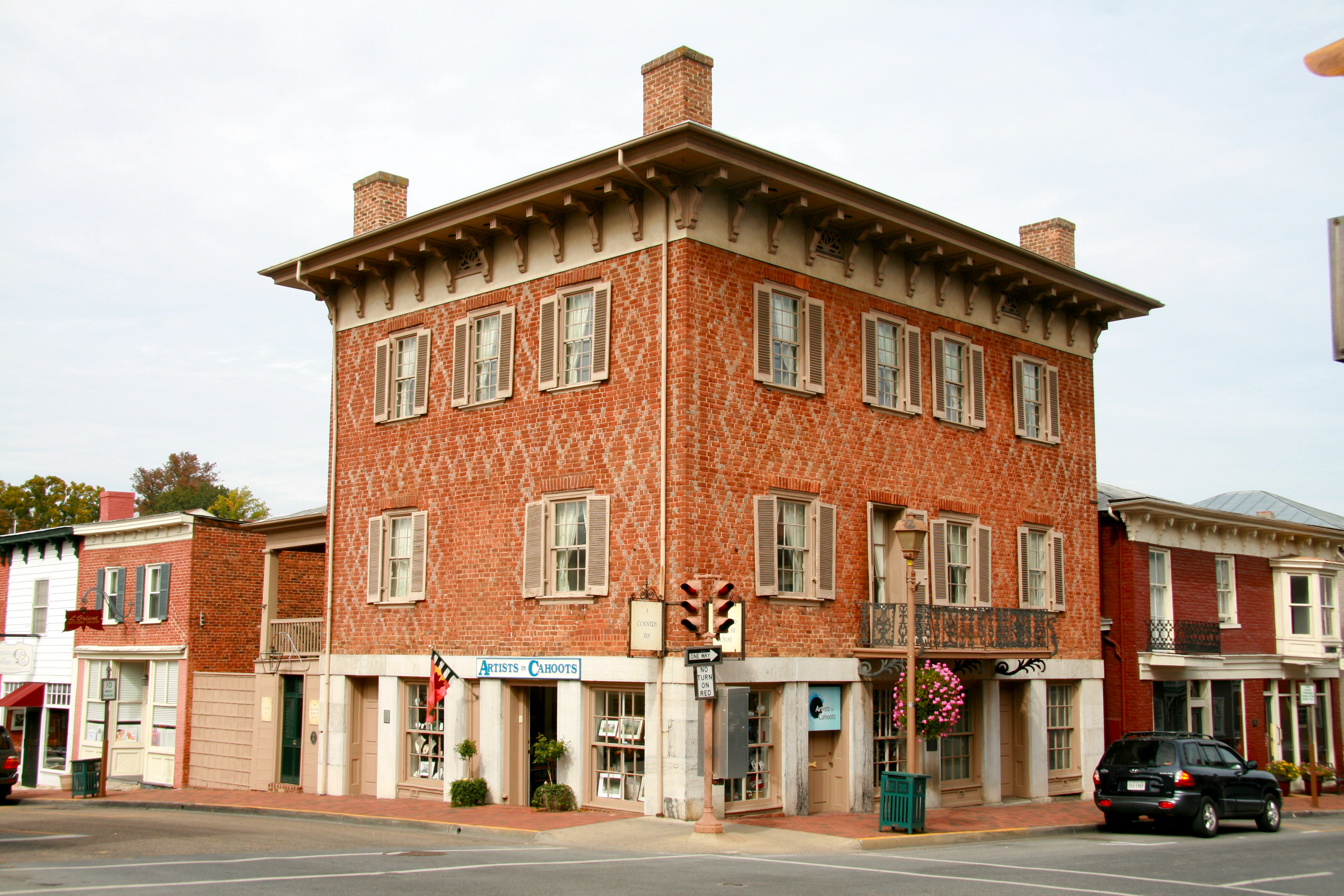
- Alexander–Withrow House

- Location within Virginia Location within the United States
- Location: Main and Washington Sts., Lexington, Virginia
- Coordinates: 37°47′7″N 79°26′31″W
- Area: 9.9 acres (4.0 ha)
- Built: c. 1790, 1850s
- NRHP reference No.: 71001055
- VLR No.: 117-0001

Significant dates
- Added to NRHP: July 2, 1971
- Designated VLR: January 5, 1971

Alexander–Withrow House is a historic home located at Lexington, Virginia. It was built about 1790, and significantly modified in the 1850s when the street was lowered by about 10 feet. The upper stories of diaper patterned brick sit on a first level of limestone. It has a shallow hipped roof and four corner chimneys. The original front entrance opens onto a small balcony with a decorative cast-iron balustrade supported on large cast-iron brackets. The house was renovated by the Historic Lexington Foundation in 1969–1970.

It was listed on the National Register of Historic Places in 1971. It is located in the Lexington Historic District.

== Gallery ==
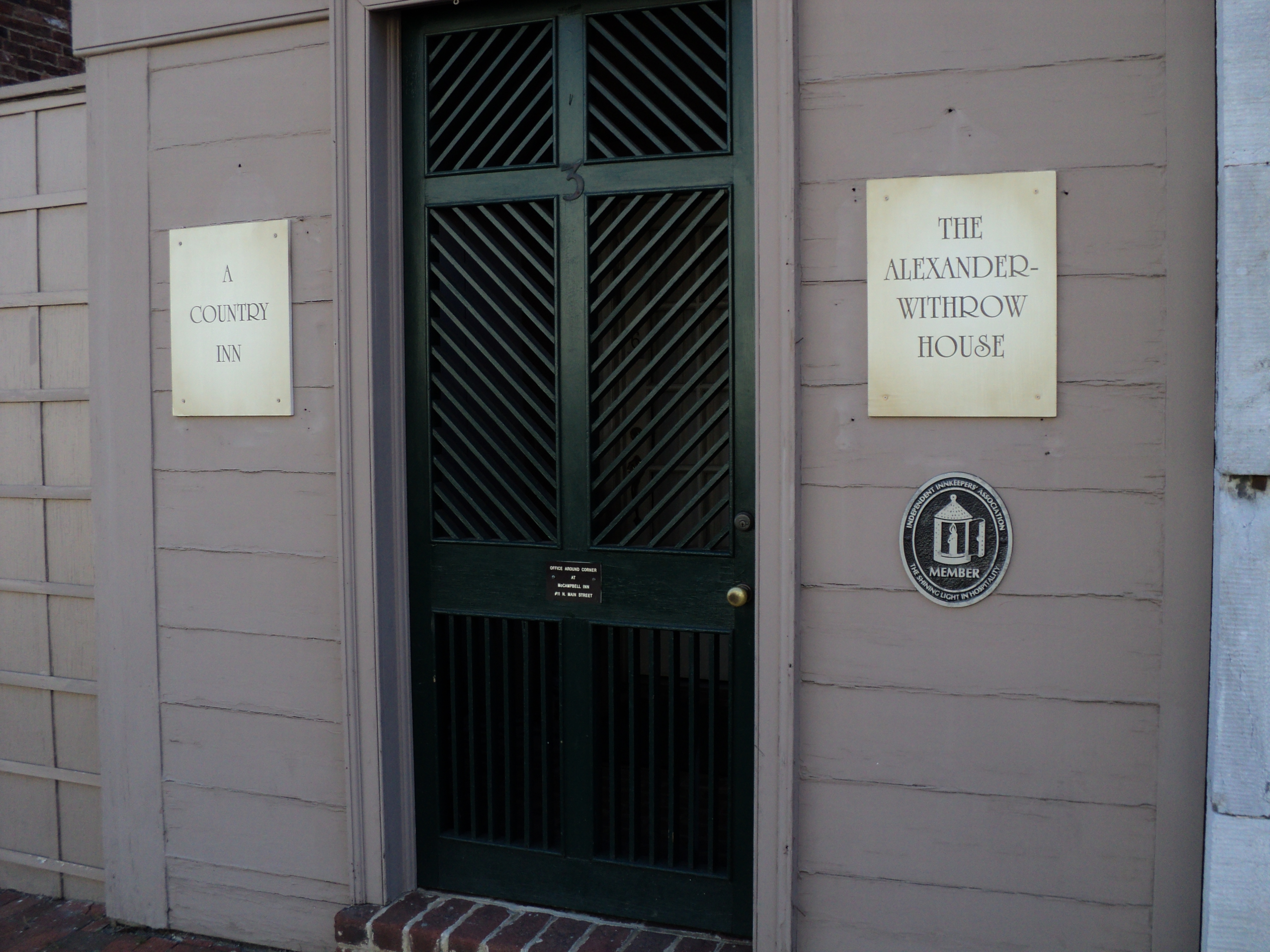
Doorway, Alexander Withrow House
