= Reid–White–Philbin House =

Historic house in Virginia, United States

- U.S. National Register of Historic Places
- U.S. Historic district – Contributing property
- Virginia Landmarks Register
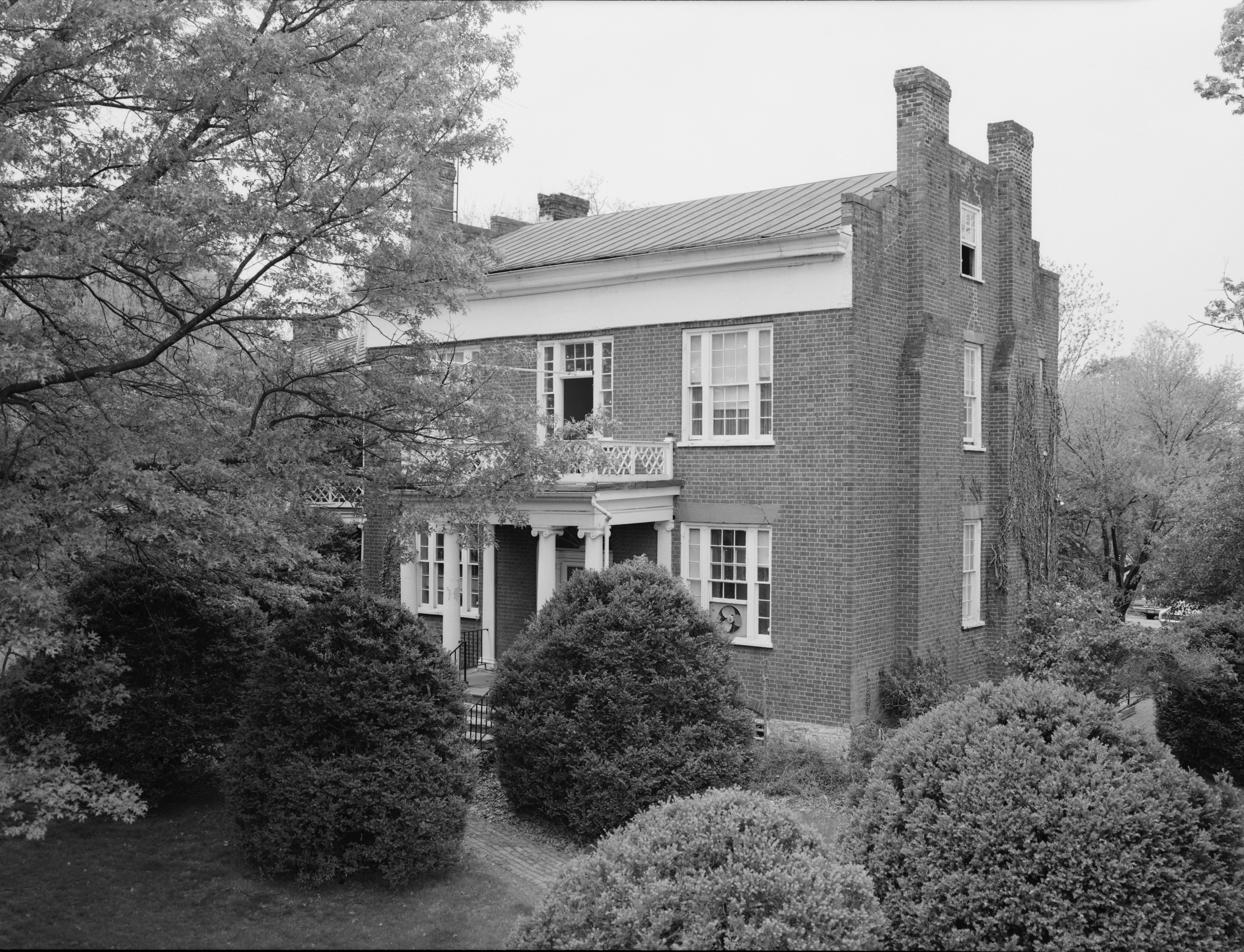
- Reid–White–Philbin House, HABS Photo

- Location within Virginia Location within the United States
- Location: 208 W. Nelson St., Lexington, Virginia
- Coordinates: 37°47′8″N 79°26′45″W
- Area: 2.5 acres (1.0 ha)
- Built: 1821, 1847
- Built by: Reid, Samuel McDowell; Sewell, Edward
- Architectural style: Federal
- NRHP reference No.: 00000889
- VLR No.: 117-0014

Significant dates
- Added to NRHP: August 2, 2000
- Designated VLR: June 14, 2000

Reid–White–Philbin House, also known as Evergreen House, is a historic home located at Lexington, Virginia. It was built in 1821, and is a two-story, Federal style brick dwelling. It features an early entry porch supported by Ionic order columns A two-story brick addition was made to the left-hand gable end in 1847. The addition has a two-tier front portico and a post-bellum conservatory with bay window. Attached to the rear is a 1 1/2-story stone kitchen wing dated to the second half of the 18th century. Also on the property is a contributing early- to mid-19th century dependency. It was built for locally prominent businessman, educator, and politician Samuel McDowell Reid.

It was listed on the National Register of Historic Places in 2000. It is located in the Lexington Historic District.
