= Stonewall Jackson House =

Historic house in Virginia, United States

- U.S. National Register of Historic Places
- U.S. Historic district – Contributing property
- Virginia Landmarks Register
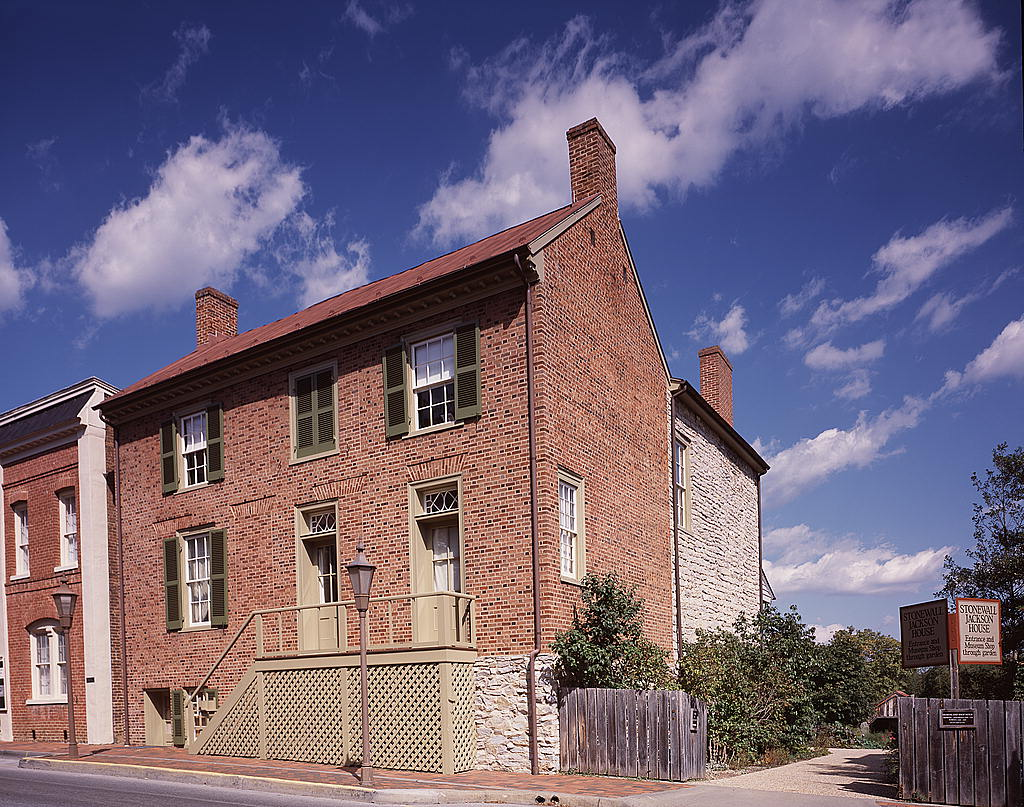
- Stonewall Jackson House, Lexington

- Location within Virginia Location within the United States
- Location: 8 E. Washington St., Lexington, Virginia
- Coordinates: 37°47′5″N 79°26′29″W
- Area: 9.9 acres (4.0 ha)
- Built: 1800
- NRHP reference No.: 73002215
- VLR No.: 117-0009

Significant dates
- Added to NRHP: April 24, 1973
- Designated VLR: June 18, 2009

The Stonewall Jackson House, located at 8 East Washington Street in the Historic District of Lexington, Virginia, was the residence of Confederate general Thomas "Stonewall" Jackson from 1858 to 1861.

== Architecture ==
The house is a two-story, four-bay, brick dwelling with a large, stone rear addition. It has a side-gable roof and interior end chimneys.

The house was constructed in 1800, by Cornelius Dorman. Dr. Archibald Graham purchased the house and significantly expanded it in 1845 by adding a stone addition on the rear and remodeling the front and interior to accommodate his medical practice. Dr. Graham sold the house to then-Major Thomas Jackson, a professor at the nearby Virginia Military Institute, on November 4, 1858, for $3000. It is the only house Jackson ever owned. He lived in the brick and stone house with his second wife, Mary Anna Morrison Jackson, until the outbreak of the American Civil War in 1861.

It housed Stonewall Jackson Memorial Hospital from 1907 until 1954; when it was converted to a museum. In 1979 the house was carefully restored to its appearance at the time of the Jacksons' occupancy. The house and garden are owned and operated as a historic house museum by the Virginia Military Institute from April through December. It was listed on the National Register of Historic Places in 1973.

== Gallery ==
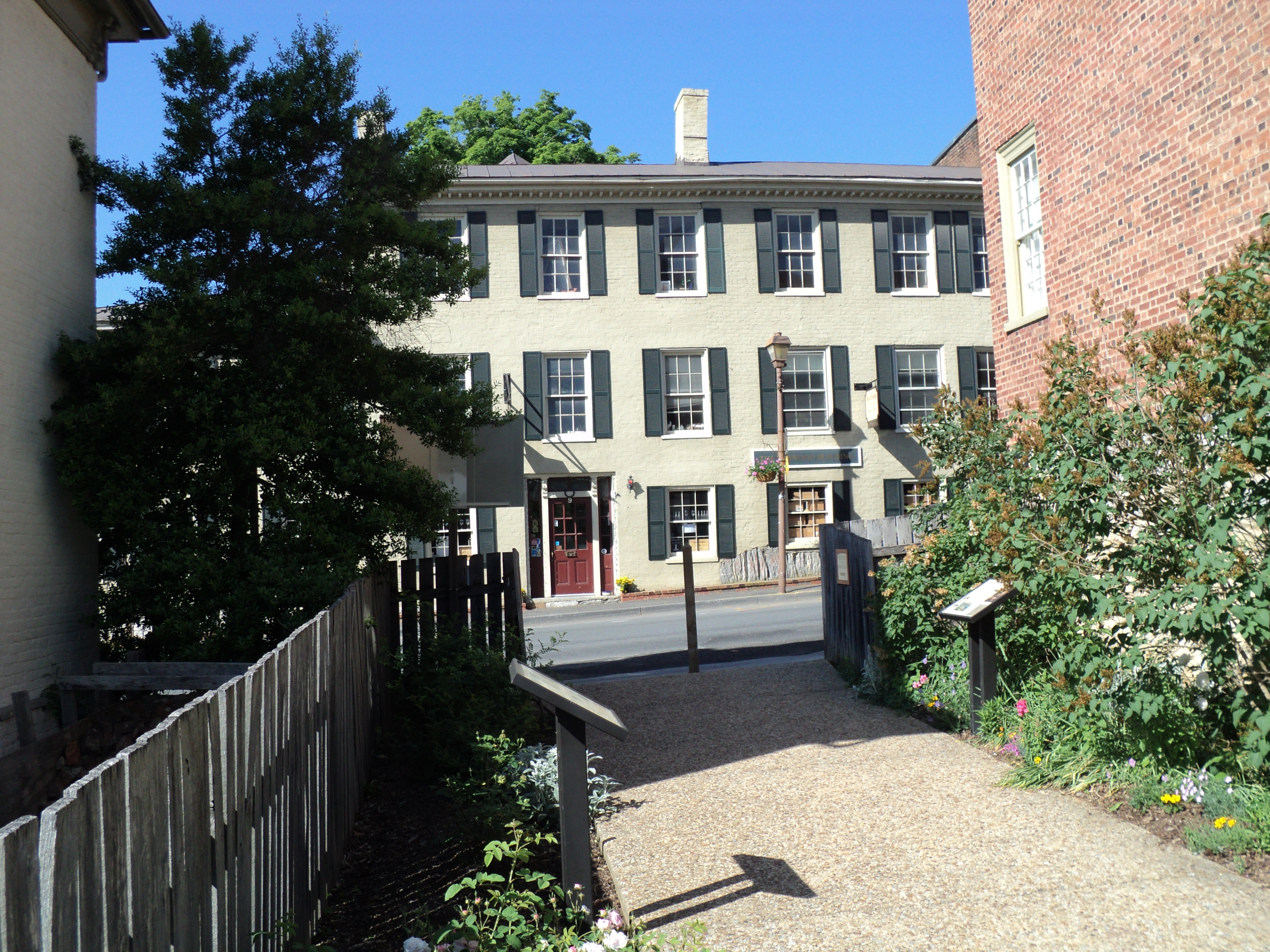
Entrance to gardens at Stonewall Jackson House, Lexington, Virginia

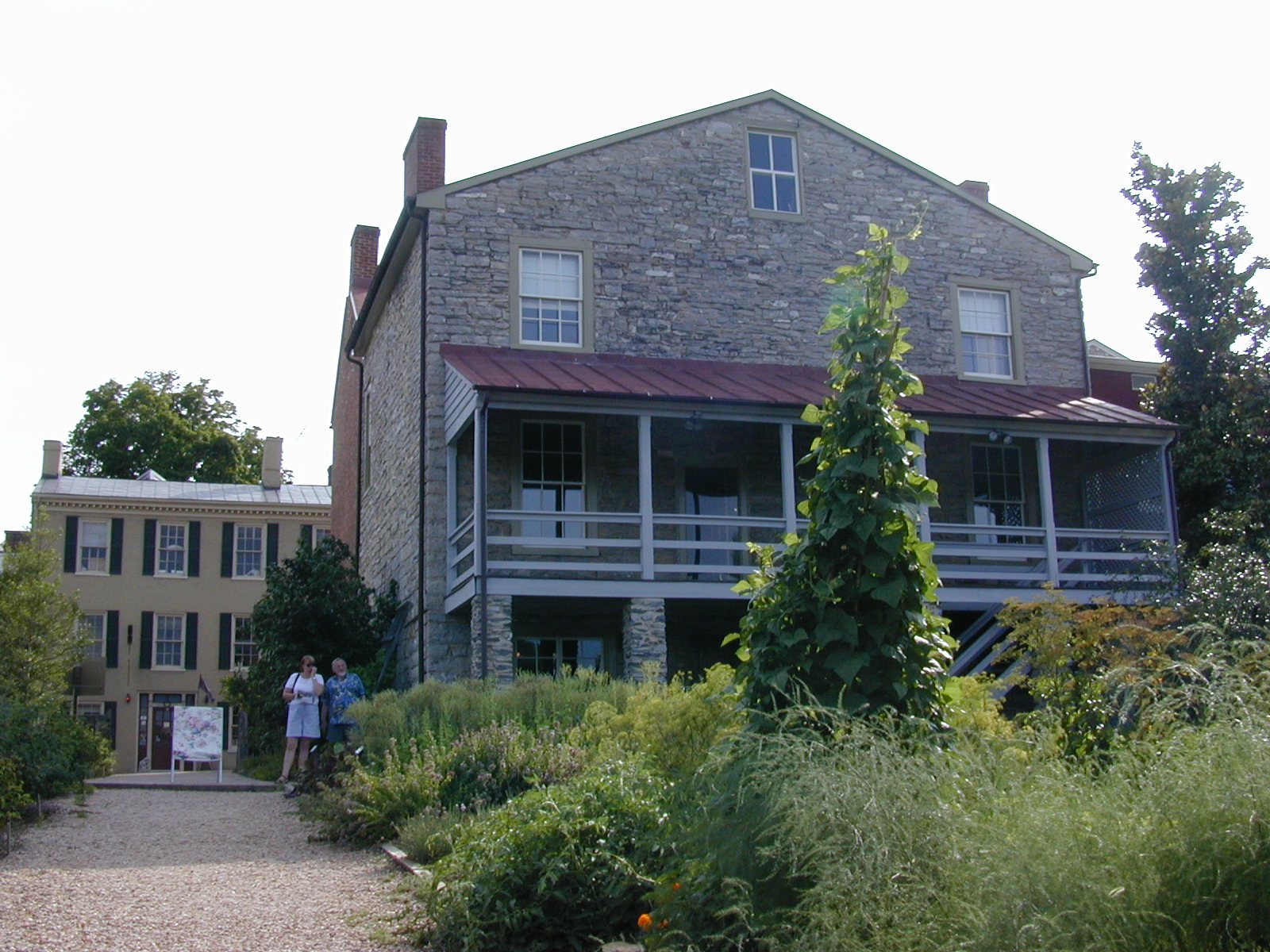
Back of house and garden

== See also ==
- Stonewall Jackson's Headquarters
