= Margaret E. Poague House =

Historic house in Virginia, United States

- U.S. National Register of Historic Places
- Virginia Landmarks Register
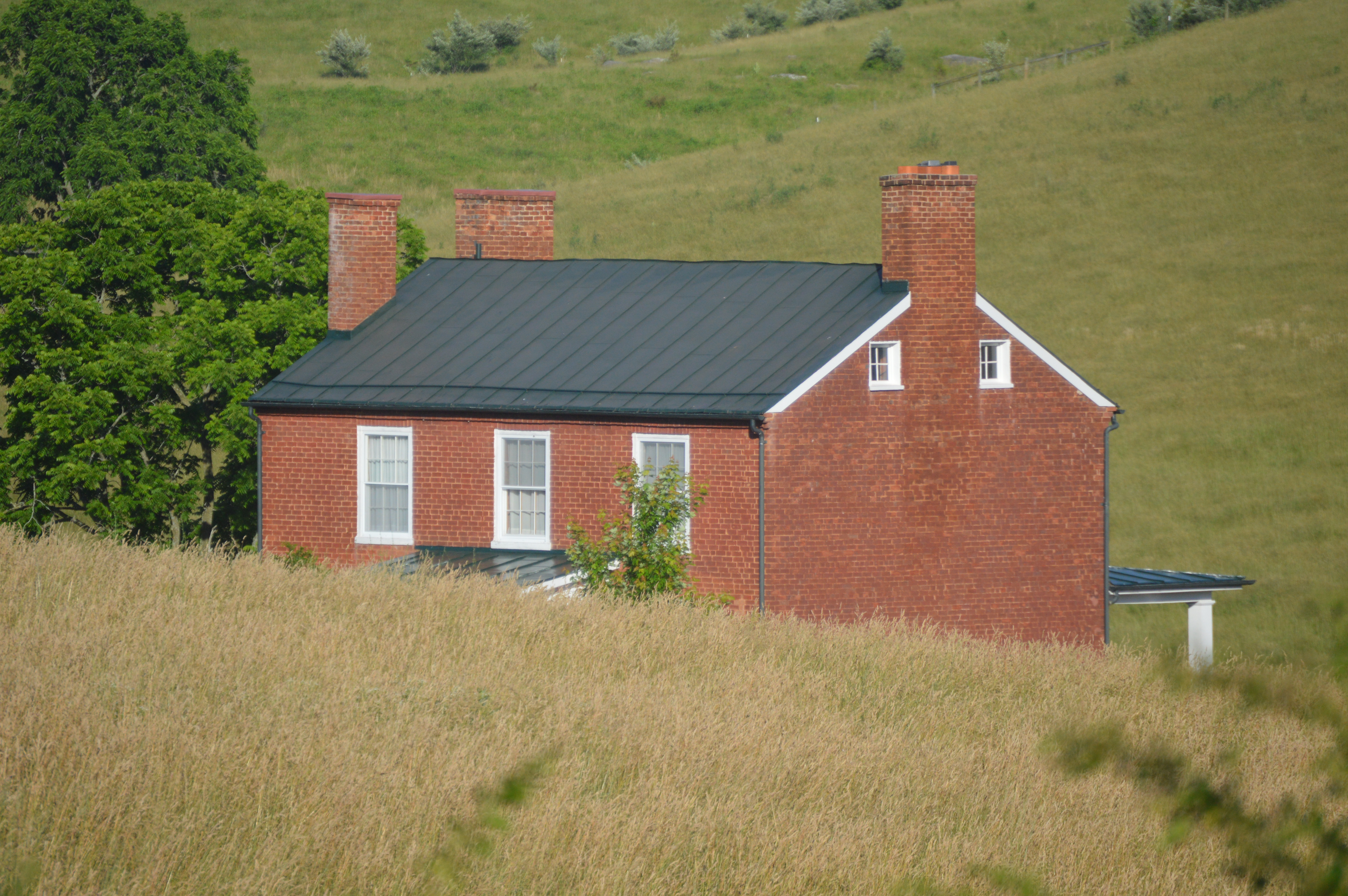
- Rear and southwestern side

- Location within Virginia Location within the United States
- Location: 4907 S. U.S. Route 11, Lexington, Virginia
- Coordinates: 37°39′43″N 79°30′39″W
- Area: 3.9 acres (1.6 ha)
- Built: c. 1847
- Architectural style: Greek Revival
- NRHP reference No.: 07000236
- VLR No.: 081-7070

Significant dates
- Added to NRHP: March 29, 2007
- Designated VLR: December 6, 2006

Margaret E. Poague House is a historic home located near Lexington, Rockbridge County, Virginia. It was built about 1847, and is a two-story, three-bay Greek Revival-style brick dwelling. It sits banked into a hillside and has a standing seam metal gable roof and interior end chimneys. The property also includes a contributing early-20th century gate pillar.

It was listed on the National Register of Historic Places in 2007.
