= Lexington Historic District (Lexington, Virginia) =

Historic district in Virginia, United States

- U.S. National Register of Historic Places
- U.S. Historic district
- Virginia Landmarks Register
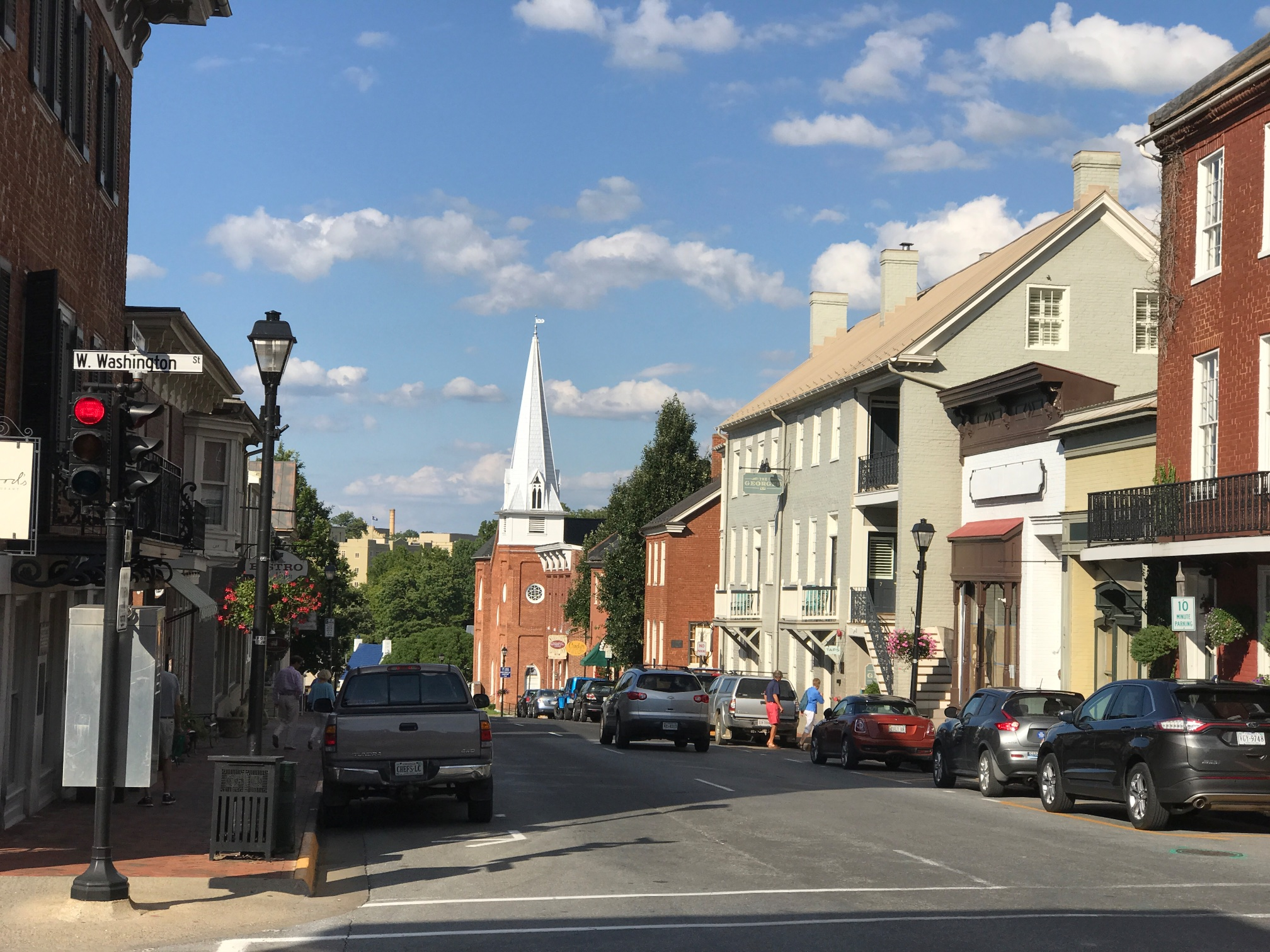
- View of North Main Street, 2017

- Location within Virginia Location within the United States
- Location: Roughly bounded by Chesapeake and Ohio RR, Graham and Jackson Aves., and Estill and Jordan Sts., Lexington, Virginia
- Coordinates: 37°47′9″N 79°26′25″W
- Area: 600 acres (240 ha)
- Built: 1823
- Built by: A.J. Davis, John Jordan
- Architectural style: Greek Revival, Queen Anne, "Picturesque Cottage"
- NRHP reference No.: 72001506
- VLR No.: 117-0027

Significant dates
- Added to NRHP: July 26, 1972
- Designated VLR: March 2, 1971

The Lexington Historic District is a national historic district located at Lexington, Virginia. It includes 11 contributing buildings on 600 acres (240 ha) and dates from 1823. It includes Greek Revival, Queen Anne, "Picturesque Cottage", and other architecture. Notable buildings include Washington Hall located on the campus of Washington and Lee University, the Virginia Military Institute, Court House, Presbyterian Manse, Halestones, and The Castle. Located in the district are the separately listed Alexander-Withrow House, Barracks, Virginia Military Institute, the Stonewall Jackson House, Lee Chapel, Lexington Presbyterian Church, Reid-White-Philbin House, and Stono.

It was listed on the National Register of Historic Places in 1972.

== Gallery ==
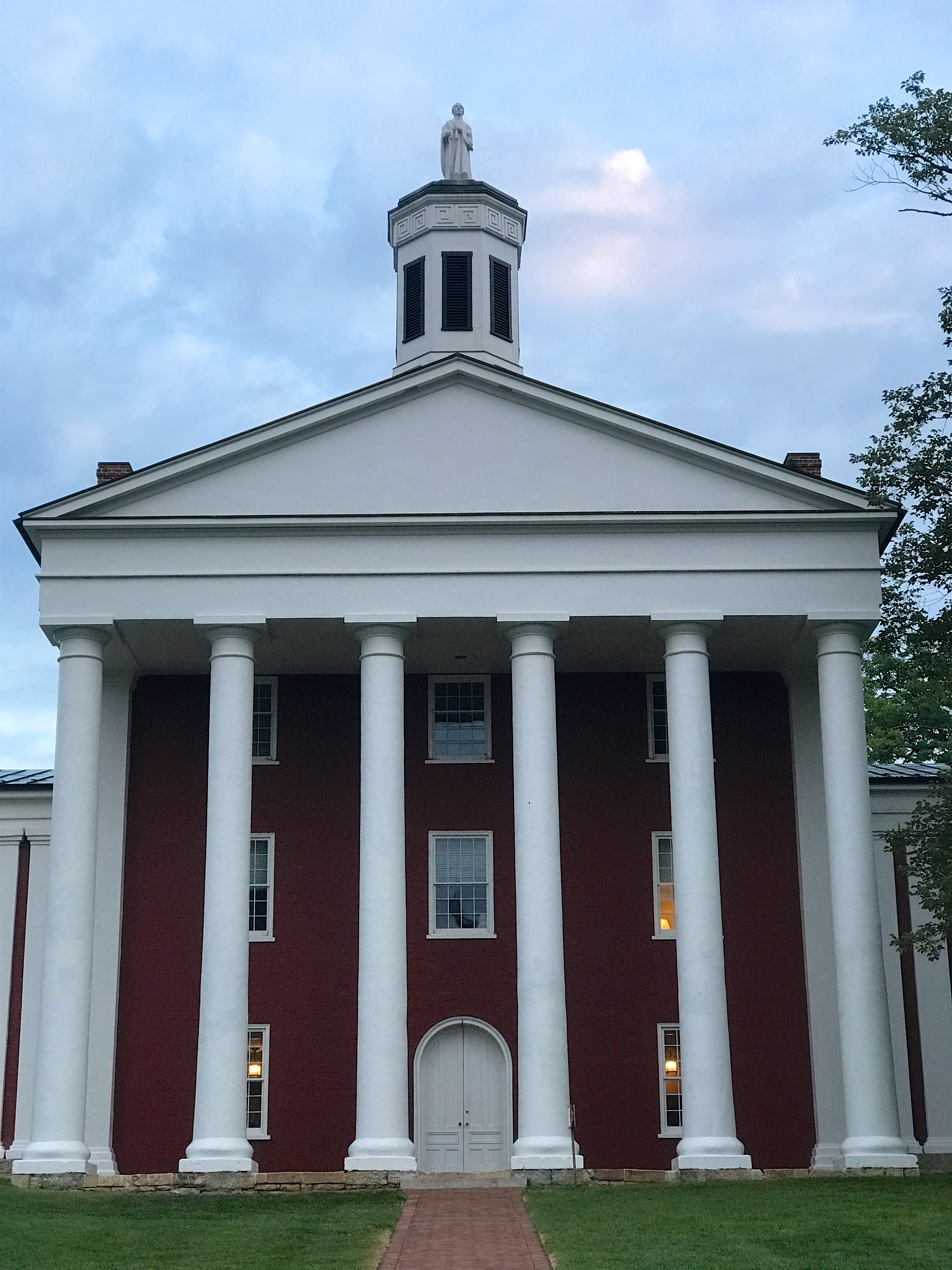
Washington Hall, Washington and Lee University

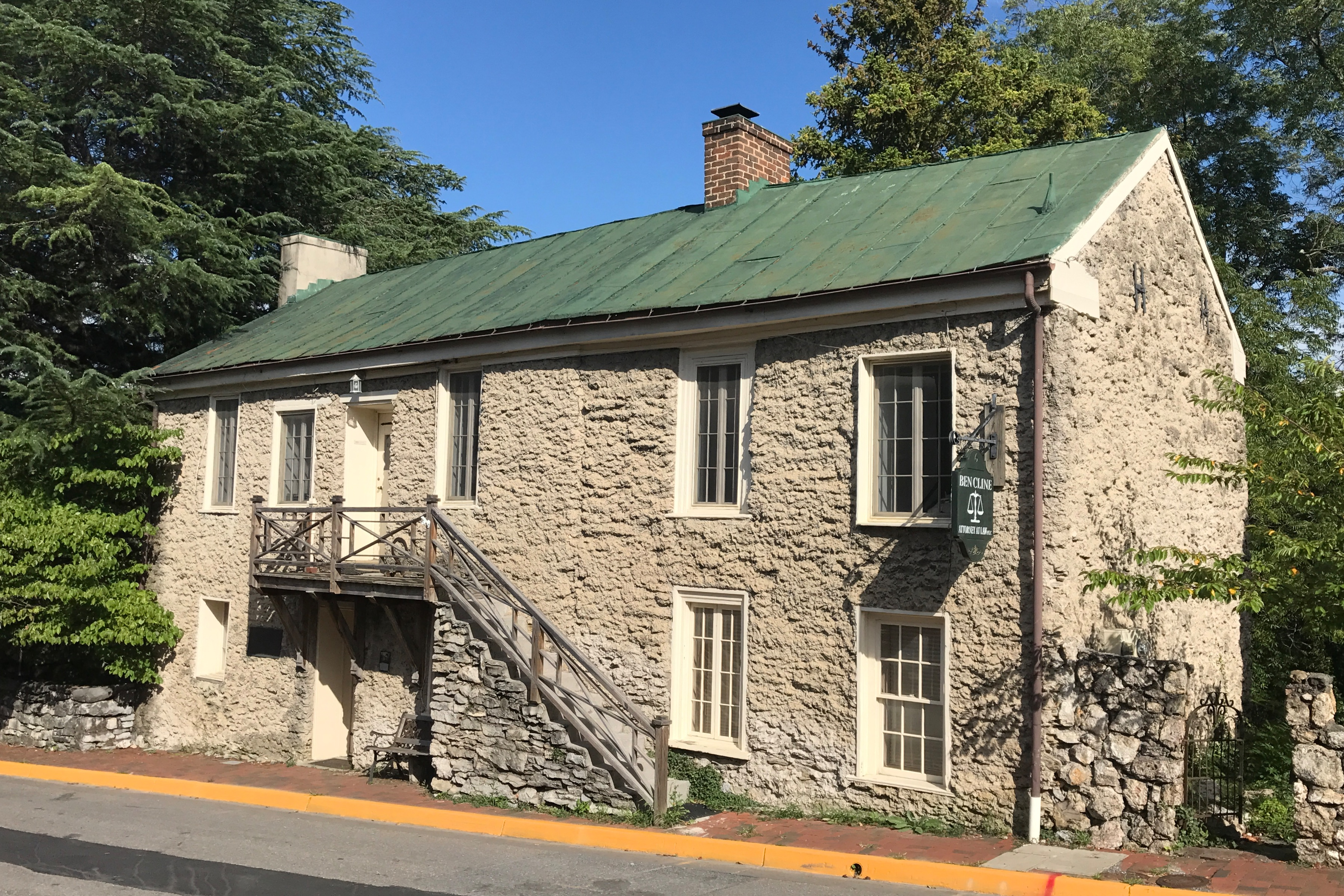
The Castle

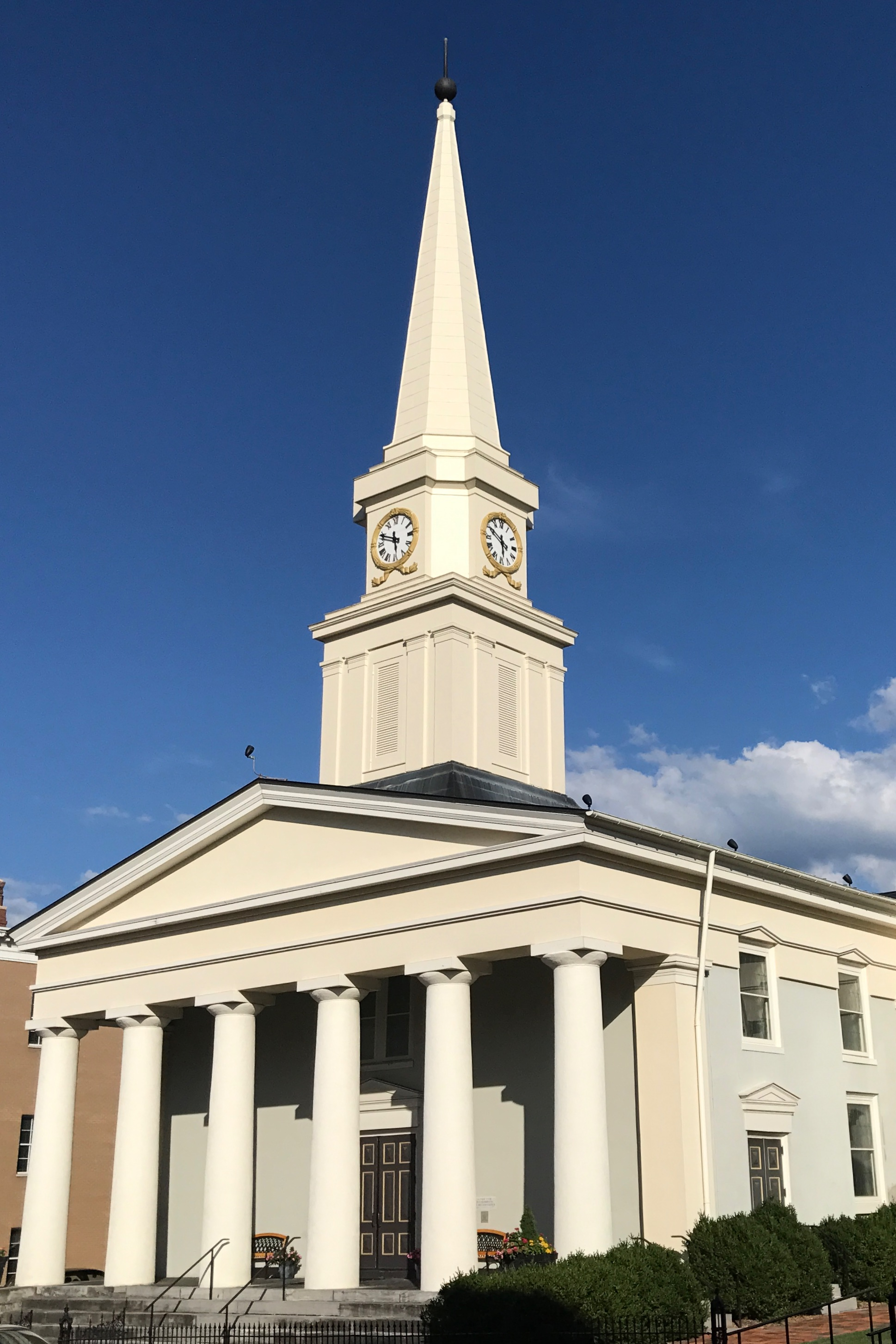
Lexington Presbyterian Church
