= Lexington, Virginia =

- Independent city
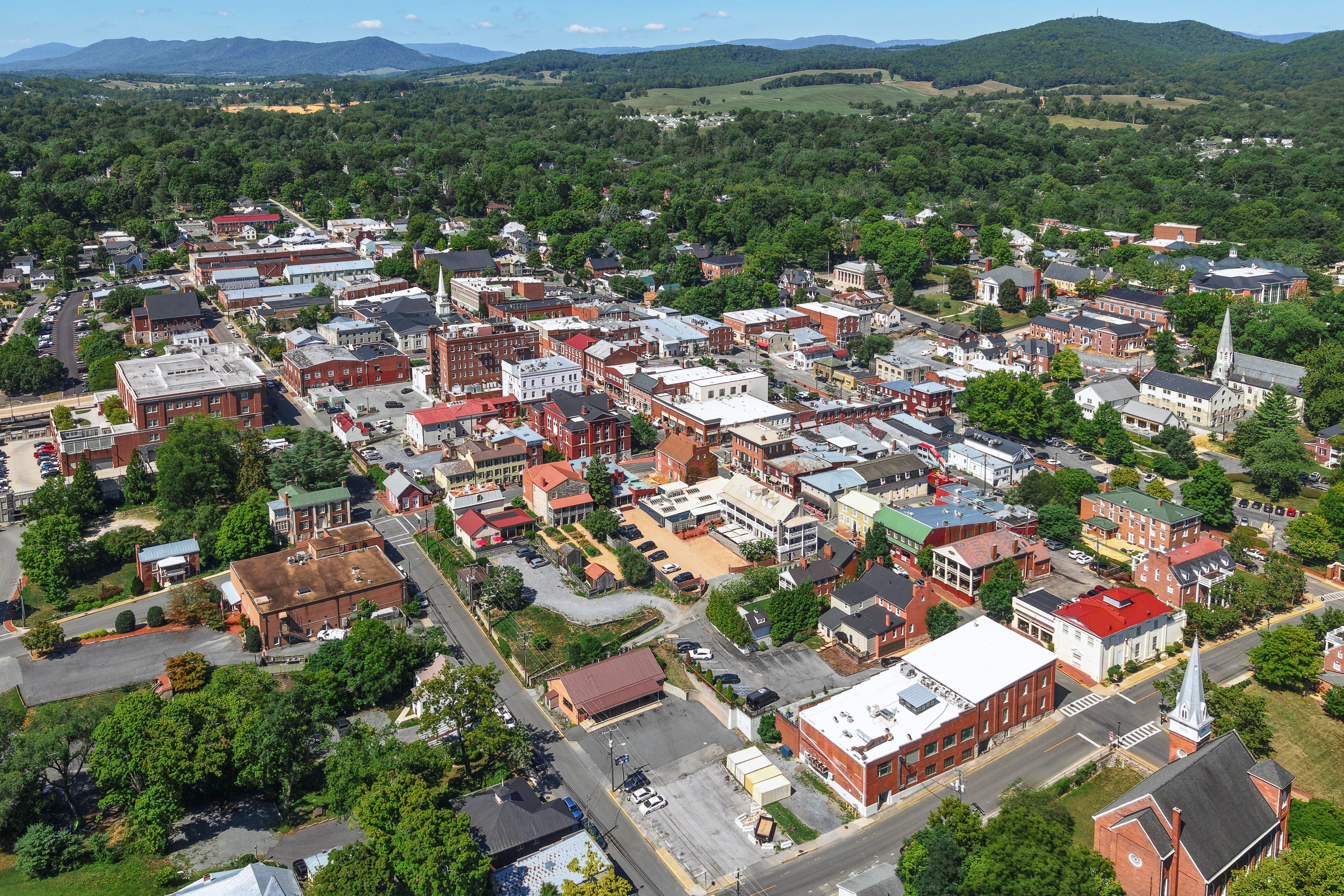
- Aerial view of downtown in 2026

- Lexington in the Commonwealth of Virginia

- Location within Shenandoah Valley Location within Virginia Location within the United States
- Coordinates: 37°47′2″N 79°26′34″W
- Country: United States
- State: Virginia
- County: None (independent city)

Government
  - Mayor: Interim, David G. Sigler
  - City manager: Tom Carroll
  - Commissioner of Revenue: Kelly Glass
  - Treasurer: Patricia DeLaney
  - City Attorney: Jeremy E. Carroll, Esquire

Area
  - Total: 2.53 sq mi (6.54 km^{2})
  - Land: 2.50 sq mi (6.47 km^{2})
  - Water: 0.027 sq mi (0.07 km^{2})
- Elevation: 1,063 ft (324 m)

Population (2020)
  - Total: 7,320
  - Estimate (2025): 7,769 ▲
  - Density: 2,930/sq mi (1,130/km^{2})
- Time zone: UTC−5 (Eastern (EST))
  - Summer (DST): UTC−4 (EDT)
- ZIP Code: 24450
- Area code: 540
- FIPS code: 51-45512
- GNIS feature ID: 1498506
- Website: Lexington, Virginia

Lexington is an independent city in the Commonwealth of Virginia, United States. At the 2020 census, the population was 7,320. It is the county seat of Rockbridge County, although the two are separate jurisdictions, and is combined with it for statistical purposes by the Bureau of Economic Analysis. Lexington is within the Shenandoah Valley about 57 miles (92 km) east of the West Virginia border and is about 50 miles (80 km) north of Roanoke, Virginia. First settled in 1778, Lexington is best known as the home of the Virginia Military Institute and Washington and Lee University.

== History ==
Lexington was named in 1778. It was the second of what would be many American places named after Lexington, Massachusetts, known for being the place at which the first shot was fired in the American Revolution.

The Union General David Hunter led a raid on Virginia Military Institute during the American Civil War. Robert E. Lee and Thomas "Stonewall" Jackson are buried in the city. It is the site of the only house Jackson ever owned, now open to the public as a museum. Cyrus McCormick invented the horse-drawn mechanical reaper at his family's farm in Rockbridge County, and a statue of McCormick is located on the Washington and Lee University campus. McCormick Farm is now owned by Virginia Tech and is a satellite agricultural research center.

== Geography ==
According to the U.S. Census Bureau, the city has a total area of 2.5 square miles (6.5 km^{2}), virtually all of which is land. The Maury River, a tributary of the James River, forms the city's northeastern boundary.

=== Climate ===
The climate in this area is characterized by hot, humid summers and generally mild to cool winters. According to the Köppen climate classification system, Lexington has a humid subtropical climate, abbreviated "Cfa" on climate maps. Average monthly temperatures range from 34.9 °F in January to 75.2 °F in July. The hardiness zone is 7a.

Climate data for Lexington, Virginia (1991–2020 normals, extremes 1889–present)
Month	Jan	Feb	Mar	Apr	May	Jun	Jul	Aug	Sep	Oct	Nov	Dec	Year
Record high °F (°C)	84 (29)	84 (29)	89 (32)	95 (35)	97 (36)	100 (38)	105 (41)	103 (39)	100 (38)	96 (36)	87 (31)	79 (26)	105 (41)
Mean daily maximum °F (°C)	45.2 (7.3)	49.3 (9.6)	57.4 (14.1)	68.4 (20.2)	75.7 (24.3)	83.1 (28.4)	86.6 (30.3)	85.4 (29.7)	79.1 (26.2)	69.1 (20.6)	57.8 (14.3)	48.3 (9.1)	67.1 (19.5)
Daily mean °F (°C)	34.2 (1.2)	37.0 (2.8)	44.3 (6.8)	54.4 (12.4)	63.1 (17.3)	71.2 (21.8)	75.3 (24.1)	74.0 (23.3)	67.3 (19.6)	56.0 (13.3)	44.8 (7.1)	37.3 (2.9)	54.9 (12.7)
Mean daily minimum °F (°C)	23.3 (−4.8)	24.8 (−4.0)	31.2 (−0.4)	40.4 (4.7)	50.5 (10.3)	59.4 (15.2)	64.0 (17.8)	62.6 (17.0)	55.5 (13.1)	42.9 (6.1)	31.9 (−0.1)	26.4 (−3.1)	42.7 (5.9)
Record low °F (°C)	−16 (−27)	−16 (−27)	−4 (−20)	14 (−10)	26 (−3)	35 (2)	44 (7)	39 (4)	30 (−1)	18 (−8)	1 (−17)	−10 (−23)	−16 (−27)
Average precipitation inches (mm)	3.15 (80)	2.76 (70)	3.52 (89)	3.71 (94)	4.11 (104)	4.80 (122)	4.10 (104)	3.31 (84)	3.67 (93)	3.06 (78)	3.23 (82)	3.47 (88)	42.89 (1,089)
Average snowfall inches (cm)	2.9 (7.4)	4.7 (12)	2.3 (5.8)	0.1 (0.25)	0.0 (0.0)	0.0 (0.0)	0.0 (0.0)	0.0 (0.0)	0.0 (0.0)	0.0 (0.0)	0.1 (0.25)	3.4 (8.6)	13.5 (34)
Average precipitation days (≥ 0.01 in)	8.5	8.4	9.9	11.1	12.2	11.9	11.2	11.0	8.8	7.8	7.8	9.9	118.5
Average snowy days (≥ 0.1 in)	2.0	1.8	1.1	0.1	0.0	0.0	0.0	0.0	0.0	0.0	0.1	1.7	6.8
Source: NOAA

== Demographics ==
Historical population
Census	Pop.	Note	%±
1850	1,743		—
1860	2,135		22.5%
1870	2,873		34.6%
1880	2,771		−3.6%
1890	3,059		10.4%
1900	3,203		4.7%
1910	2,931		−8.5%
1920	2,870		−2.1%
1930	3,752		30.7%
1940	3,914		4.3%
1950	5,976		52.7%
1960	7,537		26.1%
1970	7,597		0.8%
1980	7,292		−4.0%
1990	6,959		−4.6%
2000	6,867		−1.3%
2010	7,042		2.5%
2020	7,320		3.9%
2025 (est.)	7,769	▲	6.1%
U.S. Decennial Census; 1790–1960 1900–1990; 1990–2000 2010; 2020

=== Racial and ethnic composition ===
Lexington city, Virginia – Racial and ethnic composition Note: the US Census treats Hispanic/Latino as an ethnic category. This table excludes Latinos from the racial categories and assigns them to a separate category. Hispanics/Latinos may be of any race.
Race / Ethnicity (NH = Non-Hispanic)	Pop 1980	Pop 1990	Pop 2000	Pop 2010	Pop 2020	% 1980	% 1990	% 2000	% 2010	% 2020
White alone (NH)	6,275	5,982	5,837	5,807	6,015	86.05%	85.96%	85.00%	82.46%	82.17%
Black or African American alone (NH)	892	809	713	668	454	12.23%	11.63%	10.38%	9.49%	6.20%
Native American or Alaska Native alone (NH)	4	21	18	8	8	0.05%	0.30%	0.26%	0.11%	0.11%
Asian alone (NH)	39	85	130	153	281	0.53%	1.22%	1.89%	2.17%	3.84%
Native Hawaiian or Pacific Islander alone (NH)	x	x	1	4	0	x	x	0.01%	0.06%	0.00%
Other race alone (NH)	22	0	3	12	23	0.30%	0.00%	0.04%	0.17%	0.31%
Mixed race or Multiracial (NH)	x	x	56	119	204	x	x	0.82%	1.69%	2.79%
Hispanic or Latino (any race)	60	62	109	271	335	0.82%	0.89%	1.59%	3.85%	4.58%
Total	7,292	6,959	6,867	7,042	7,320	100.00%	100.00%	100.00%	100.00%	100.00%

=== 2020 census ===
As of the 2020 census, Lexington had a population of 7,320. The median age was 22.7 years. 11.4% of residents were under the age of 18 and 16.9% of residents were 65 years of age or older. For every 100 females there were 125.6 males, and for every 100 females age 18 and over there were 129.3 males age 18 and over.

100.0% of residents lived in urban areas, while 0.0% lived in rural areas.

There were 2,239 households in Lexington, of which 22.5% had children under the age of 18 living in them. Of all households, 35.9% were married-couple households, 22.7% were households with a male householder and no spouse or partner present, and 37.0% were households with a female householder and no spouse or partner present. About 41.7% of all households were made up of individuals and 20.4% had someone living alone who was 65 years of age or older.

There were 2,617 housing units, of which 14.4% were vacant. The homeowner vacancy rate was 2.1% and the rental vacancy rate was 7.8%.

Racial composition as of the 2020 census
Race	Number	Percent
White	6,112	83.5%
Black or African American	459	6.3%
American Indian and Alaska Native	20	0.3%
Asian	281	3.8%
Native Hawaiian and Other Pacific Islander	0	0.0%
Some other race	123	1.7%
Two or more races	325	4.4%
Hispanic or Latino (of any race)	335	4.6%

=== 2000 census ===
As of the census of 2000, there were 6,867 people, 2,232 households, and 1,080 families residing in the city. The population density was 2,753.8 per square mile (,064.8/km^{2}). The racial makeup was 86.01% White, 10.38% African American, 0.26% Native American, 1.92% Asian, 0.01% Pacific Islander and 0.48% from other races, and 0.93% from two or more races. Hispanic or Latino of any race were 4.1% of the population.

There were 2,232 households, of which 18.3% had children under the age of 18 living with them, 36.9% were married couples living together, 8.8% had a female householder with no husband present, and 51.6% were non-families. 41.0% of all households were made up of individuals, and 17.7% had someone living alone who was 65 years of age or older. The average household size was 2.06 and the average family size was 2.76.

In the city, the population was spread out, with 11.0% under the age of 18, 41.4% from 18 to 24, 14.5% from 25 to 44, 16.7% from 45 to 64, and 16.4% who were 65 years of age or older. The median age was 23 years. For every 100 females, there were 123.2 males. For every 100 females aged 18 and over, there were 127.2 males.

The median income for a household in the city was $28,982, and the median income for a family was $58,529. Males had a median income of $35,288 versus $26,094 for females. The per capita income was $16,497. About 8.4% of families and 21.6% of the population were below the poverty line, including 12.9% of those under age 18 and 12.0% of those age 65 or over.

== Economy ==
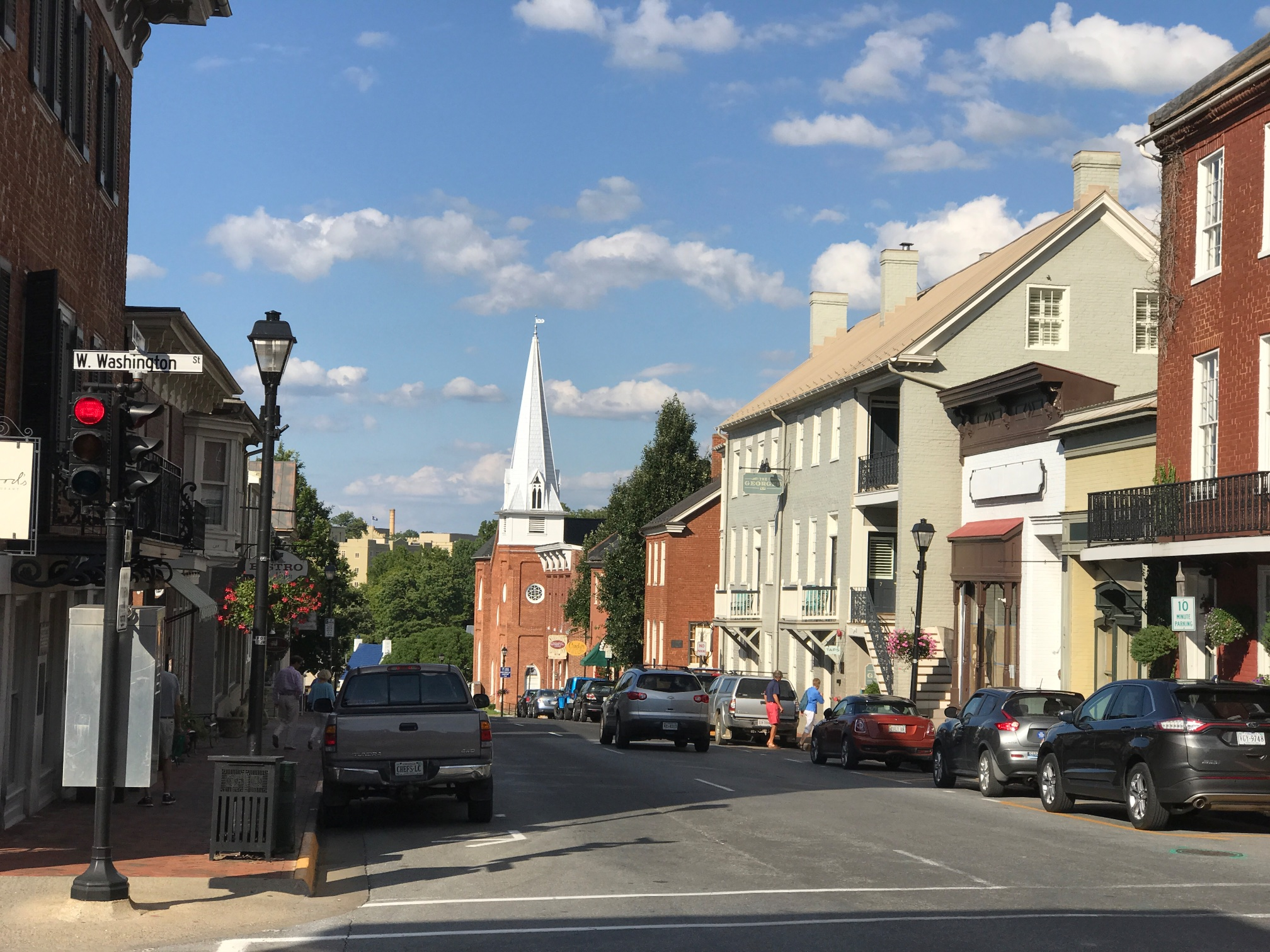
View of the First Baptist Church along Main Street in the Lexington Historic District

Lexington's primary economic activities stem from higher education and tourism. With its various connections to the Civil War, Lexington attracts visitors from around the country. Places of interest in Lexington include the Stonewall Jackson House, University Chapel, the George C. Marshall Library, Virginia Military Institute Museum, Museum of Military Memorabilia, and the downtown historic district. Hull's Drive In theater attracts visitors to the area and was the first community-owned, non-profit drive-in in the U.S. The non-profit Virginia Horse Center is a significant regional equestrian event facility.

Lexington also contains a host of small retail businesses, bed and breakfast inns, and restaurants catering to a unique mixture of local, tourist, and collegiate clientele. The historic R. E. Lee Hotel, built in the 1920s, underwent extensive renovation and re-opened its doors late 2014.

== Points of interest ==
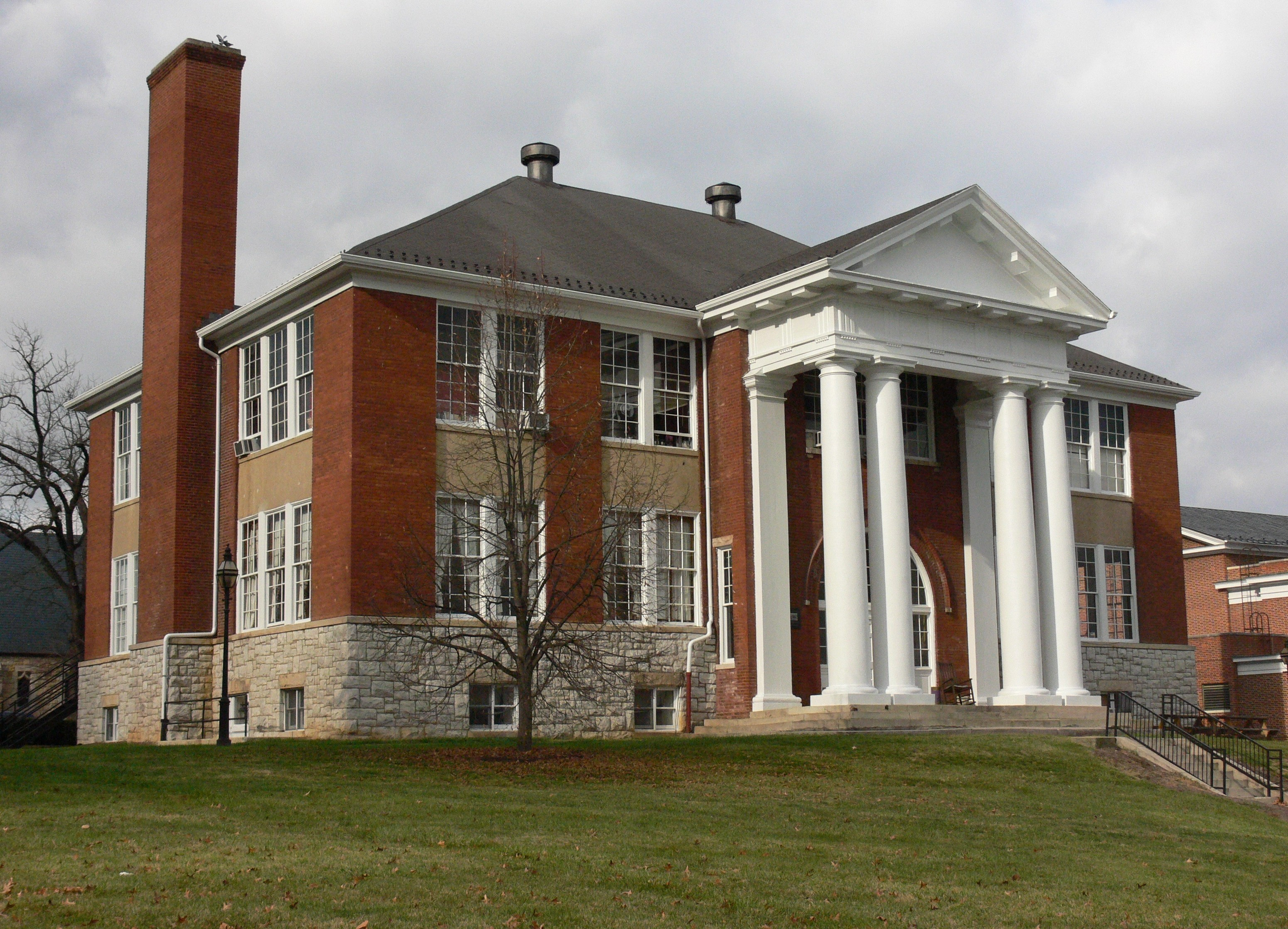
Lexington High School, designed by architect Charles M. Robinson and constructed in 1908, was typical of the modern public schools that cities built during the Progressive Era.

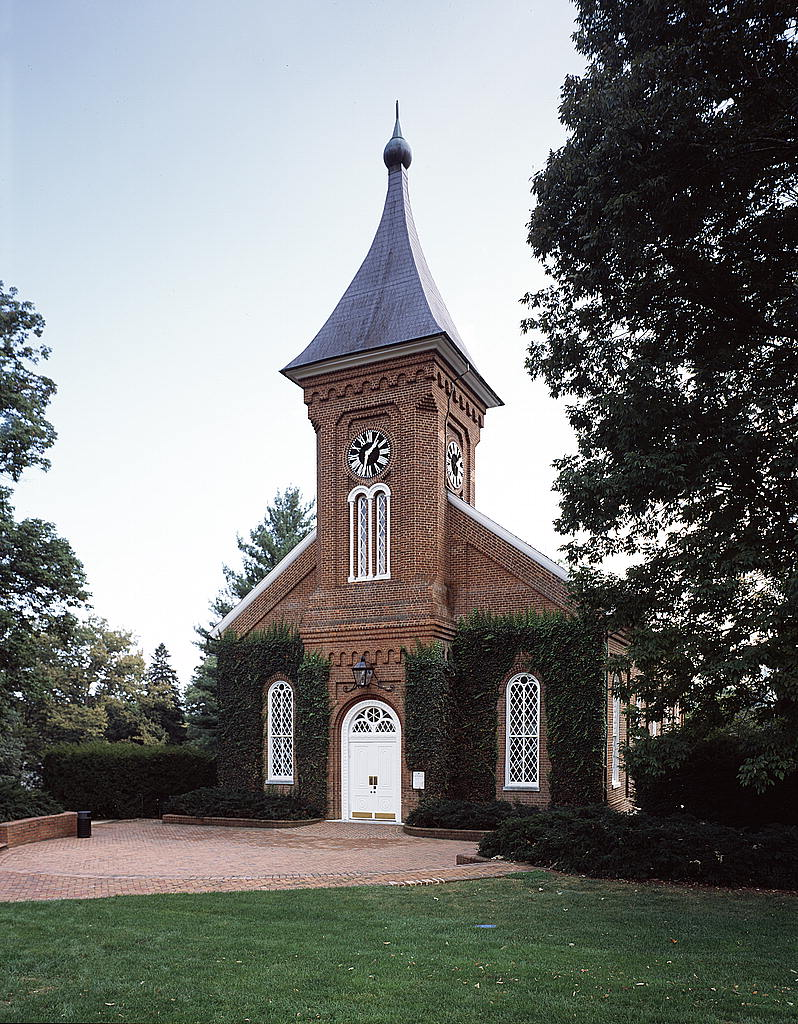
University Chapel

- George C. Marshall Foundation
- Robert E. Lee grave site, found in University Chapel on the W&L campus.
- Traveller (Robert E. Lee's horse) grave site, found along a walkway just outside University Chapel.
- Thomas "Stonewall" Jackson grave site, found at Oak Grove Cemetery
- Stonewall Jackson House, residence of Confederate general Thomas "Stonewall" Jackson
- Sam Houston's place of birth (nearby)
- Cyrus McCormick Farm, birthplace and museum (nearby)
- Kappa Alpha Order international headquarters
- Omicron Delta Kappa national headquarters
- Sigma Nu international headquarters
- Chessie Nature Trail follows the former C&O railway bed along the Maury River
- Natural Bridge (nearby)
- Hull's Drive In, the first non-profit drive-in theater in the U.S. (nearby)
- Gems of the Rockbridge geocaching trail
- Located near Lexington are a number of properties listed on the National Register of Historic Places, including: Anderson Hollow Archaeological District, Cedar Hill Church and Cemeteries, Chapel Hill, Church Hill, Clifton, Hamilton Schoolhouse, Liberty Hall Site, Lylburn Downing School, Maple Hall, John Moore House, Mountain View Farm, Margaret E. Poague House, Springdale, Stone House, Sunnyside, Tankersley Tavern, Thorn Hill, Timber Ridge Presbyterian Church, and Willson House.
- Lexington Carriage Company

== Government ==
United States presidential election results for Lexington, Virginia
Year	Republican		Democratic		Third party(ies)	
Year	No.	%	No.	%	No.	%
1968	1,170	56.12%	734	35.20%	181	8.68%
1972	1,345	64.98%	695	33.57%	30	1.45%
1976	1,027	50.47%	945	46.44%	63	3.10%
1980	956	45.90%	963	46.23%	164	7.87%
1984	1,197	55.34%	946	43.74%	20	0.92%
1988	994	49.11%	997	49.26%	33	1.63%
1992	894	39.26%	1,128	49.54%	255	11.20%
1996	850	41.56%	1,059	51.78%	136	6.65%
2000	957	44.72%	1,048	48.97%	135	6.31%
2004	982	41.81%	1,340	57.05%	27	1.15%
2008	914	36.87%	1,543	62.24%	22	0.89%
2012	1,146	42.65%	1,486	55.30%	55	2.05%
2016	766	31.08%	1,514	61.42%	185	7.51%
2020	906	32.80%	1,791	64.84%	65	2.35%
2024	1,030	35.58%	1,795	62.00%	70	2.42%

Position	Official
Mayor	Frank Friedman
Councilwoman	Marylin Alexander
Councilman	John Driscoll
Councilman	Nicolas Betts
Councilman	David Sigler
Councilman	Charles Smith
Councilwoman	Leslie Straughan

== Media ==
The News-Gazette is the weekly community paper; it also produces a free shopper known as The Weekender. The now-defunct The Rockbridge Weekly, noted for printing police and other local crime reports, was bought by The News-Gazette in June 2012. The Rockbridge Advocate is a monthly news magazine with the motto "Independent as a hog on ice". The Ring-tum Phi, student newspaper of W&L, has been published since 1897 (with a suspension for World War II).

Lexington is the city of license for radio stations WIQR (88.7 FM), WMRL (89.9 FM), and WLUR (91.5 FM) on W&L campus.

== Transportation ==
Lexington is located at the intersection of historic U.S. Route 11 and U.S. Route 60 and more modern highways, Interstate 64 and Interstate 81. RADAR Transit operates the Maury Express, which provides local bus service to Lexington and Buena Vista. The Virginia Breeze provides intercity bus service between Blacksburg and Washington, D.C., with a stop in Lexington.

== Motion pictures ==
The 1938 movie, Brother Rat, which starred Ronald Reagan, was shot in Lexington. After the release, Reagan was made an honorary VMI cadet. The 1958 Mardi Gras starred Pat Boone as a VMI cadet appearing with actress Christine Carère. Sommersby from 1993 starred Richard Gere, Bill Pullman, James Earl Jones, and Jodie Foster. Foreign Student, released in 1994, was based on a novel of college life by former W&L student Phillipe Labro with related scenes made in the town. In Fall 2004, the director Steven Spielberg and Tom Cruise filmed scenes for War of the Worlds here, with Dakota Fanning and Tim Robbins. In June 2013, filming took place for a movie titled Field of Lost Shoes about the Battle of New Market starring Luke Benward and Lauren Holly.

Filming for parts of several Civil War films also took place in Lexington, including the documentary Lee Beyond the Battles and Gods and Generals.

== Controversies ==
=== Flag controversy ===
In 2011, the city erupted in controversy after the City Council passed an ordinance to ban the flying of flags other than the United States flag, the Virginia Flag, and an as-yet-undesigned city flag on city light poles. Various flags of the Confederacy had previously been flown on city light poles to commemorate the Virginia holiday, Lee–Jackson Day which ended in 2020, which is observed on the Friday before Martin Luther King, Jr. Day. About 300 Confederate flag supporters, including members of the Sons of Confederate Veterans, rallied before the City Council meeting, and after the vote the Sons of Confederate Veterans vowed to challenge the new local ordinance in court. Previously, flags such as the Washington and Lee University and Virginia Military Institute flags had also been flown on city light poles, but the practice is now discontinued due to the city's ordinance.

In 2014, a large Confederate battle flag and a number of related state flags were removed from Lee Chapel at Washington and Lee University. The flags were moved to a rotating display at the Lee Chapel Museum.

=== Red Hen restaurant controversy ===
The Red Hen restaurant was the site of the June 22, 2018, precipitating event for the Red Hen restaurant controversy in which a restaurant co-owner asked White House Press Secretary Sarah Huckabee Sanders to leave the restaurant by citing Huckabee Sanders' role in the Trump administration. The incident sparked national controversy.

== Notable people ==
- William H. Armstrong, children's author and educator
- Baroness, American heavy metal band whose early members grew up together in Lexington
- Lena Northern Buckner, social worker
- Howard Drew, competitor in the 1912 Summer Olympics.
- Kelly Evans, journalist and co-presenter for CNBC
- Hilary Hahn, classical violinist.
- Larry Keel, bandleader and musician
- John Letcher, 34th Governor of Virginia.
- William Lindsay, U.S. Senator from Kentucky.
- William A. MacCorkle, ninth Governor of West Virginia.
- Sally Mann, photographer.
- Gary W. Martini, posthumously awarded the Medal of Honor for his actions in the Vietnam War
- William G. McDowell, Episcopal prelate who served as the fifth Bishop of Alabama
- Robert Paxton, political scientist and historian.
- William N. Pendleton, Confederate general, longtime chief artilleryman for Robert E. Lee
- John Thomas Lewis Preston, founder of Virginia Military Institute.
- Brent Pry, college football coach
- Reginald H. Ridgely Jr., United States Marine Corps lieutenant general; born in Lexington
- Pat Robertson, founder and chairman of Christian Broadcasting Network.
- Jefferson Shields (1829–1918), slave
- Cy Twombly, artist.

== See also ==
- National Register of Historic Places listings in Lexington, Virginia
