= National Register of Historic Places listings in Rockbridge County, Virginia =

Location of Rockbridge County in Virginia

This is a list of the National Register of Historic Places listings in Rockbridge County, Virginia.

This is intended to be a complete list of the properties and districts on the National Register of Historic Places in Rockbridge County, Virginia, United States. The locations of National Register properties and districts for which the latitude and longitude coordinates are included below, may be seen in an online map.

There are 52 properties and districts listed on the National Register in the county, including 3 National Historic Landmarks.

This National Park Service list is complete through NPS recent listings posted August 7, 2026.

== Current listings ==
	Name on the Register	Image	Date listed	Location	City or town	Description
1	Anderson Hollow Archaeological District	Anderson Hollow Archaeological District	July 21, 1983 (#83003314)	Western side of Big Hill Rd. 37°51′06″N 79°35′02″W	Lexington	
2	Blue Ridge Parkway	Blue Ridge Parkway	December 13, 2024 (#100011353)	Blue Ridge Parkway through Virginia and North Carolina; 37°42′08″N 79°19′18″W	Buena Vista vicinity	
3	Boxerwood	Boxerwood	June 4, 2015 (#15000254)	963 Ross Rd. 37°46′36″N 79°27′54″W	Lexington	
4	Brown-Swisher Barn	Brown-Swisher Barn	August 11, 2020 (#100005436)	2939 Walkers Creek Rd. 37°58′29″N 79°22′48″W	Middlebrook	
5	Brownsburg Historic District	Brownsburg Historic District	July 2, 1973 (#73002055)	Including the entire village extending 0.5 miles (0.80 km) along State Route 252; 37°55′43″N 79°19′09″W	Brownsburg	
6	Buffalo Forge (081-0003)	Buffalo Forge (081-0003)	May 26, 2004 (#04000551)	2694 Forge Rd. 37°41′11″N 79°26′06″W	Glasgow	
7	Cedar Hill	Cedar Hill	July 15, 1994 (#94000726)	Eastern side of Forge Rd., 2.25 miles (3.62 km) south of its junction with U.S. Route 60; 37°43′05″N 79°23′57″W	Buena Vista	
8	Cedar Hill Church and Cemeteries	Cedar Hill Church and Cemeteries	February 11, 2002 (#01001570)	Cedar Hill Church Rd. and Kygers Hill Rd. 37°44′31″N 79°31′34″W	Lexington	
9	Chapel Hill	Chapel Hill	June 8, 2011 (#11000350)	68 Charming Ln. 37°43′15″N 79°24′45″W	Lexington	
10	Church Hill	Church Hill	February 26, 1979 (#79003079)	6.5 miles (10.5 km) northeast of Lexington off U.S. Route 11 at Interstate 64; 37°50′31″N 79°21′32″W	Lexington	
11	Clifton	Clifton	July 22, 1994 (#94000778)	Northern side of Old Buena Vista Rd., 2,000 feet (610 m) east of its junction with U.S. Route 11; 37°47′29″N 79°25′07″W	Lexington	
12	Echols Farm	Echols Farm	October 30, 1998 (#98001312)	Junction of U.S. Route 501 and State Route 130; 37°37′47″N 79°26′28″W	Glasgow	
13	Falling Spring Presbyterian Church Manse	Falling Spring Presbyterian Church Manse	November 16, 2005 (#05001269)	650 Falling Spring Rd. 37°41′00″N 79°27′34″W	Glasgow	
14	Fancy Hill	Fancy Hill	September 5, 1997 (#97000957)	Junction of U.S. Route 11 and Falling Spring Rd. 37°41′23″N 79°29′11″W	Glasgow	
15	Glasgow Historic District	Glasgow Historic District	October 30, 1995 (#95001170)	Bounded by 7th, 10th, Gordon, and Powhatan Sts.; also the 900 blocks of Fizlee St. and Rockbridge Rd. 37°38′01″N 79°27′00″W	Glasgow	Second set of boundaries represents a boundary increase of May 3, 2006
16	Glen Maury	Glen Maury	May 24, 1979 (#79003078)	West of Buena Vista; 37°43′49″N 79°21′46″W	Buena Vista	
17	Goshen Land Company Bridge	Goshen Land Company Bridge	May 15, 1978 (#78003041)	East of Goshen on Paxton Dr. 37°59′09″N 79°29′38″W	Goshen	
18	Haines Chapel and Cemetery	Haines Chapel and Cemetery	February 10, 2014 (#13001174)	2600 State Route 56; 37°53′18″N 79°09′17″W	Vesuvius	Extends into Nelson County
19	Hamilton Schoolhouse	Hamilton Schoolhouse	November 21, 2002 (#02001372)	S. Buffalo Rd. 37°42′07″N 79°35′49″W	Lexington	
20	Hays Creek Mill	Hays Creek Mill	August 4, 1995 (#95000973)	Hays Creek Rd., 0.1 miles north of its junction with McElwee Rd. 37°56′08″N 79°20′37″W	Brownsburg	
21	Hickory Hill	Hickory Hill	August 30, 2006 (#06000760)	197 Hickory Hill Ln. 37°39′55″N 79°28′43″W	Glasgow	
22	Kennedy-Lunsford Farm	Kennedy-Lunsford Farm	June 7, 1996 (#96000592)	Approximately 0.5 miles south of Raphine Rd. near its junction with Gibbs Run Ln.; also 1194 Raphine Rd. 37°56′14″N 79°16′04″W	Raphine	1194 Raphine represents a boundary increase of February 22, 1999
23	Kennedy-Wade Mill	Kennedy-Wade Mill	July 13, 1979 (#79003296)	2.3 miles northeast of Brownsburg on Raphine Rd.; also Raphine Rd., 2000 feet northeast of its junction with Goose Creek Rd. 37°56′57″N 79°17′10″W	Raphine	Second set of boundaries represents a boundary increase of May 26, 1994, the Kennedy-Wade's Mill Historic District
24	Level Loop	Level Loop	August 12, 1993 (#93000822)	Hays Creek Rd., 1 mile west of Brownsburg and 0.5 mile east of McClung's Mill; 37°55′57″N 79°20′12″W	Brownsburg	
25	Liberty Hall Site	Liberty Hall Site	August 16, 1977 (#77001493)	West of the Washington and Lee University campus 37°47′34″N 79°27′02″W	Lexington	Site of predecessor of Washington and Lee University
26	Locust Hill	Locust Hill	May 12, 1986 (#86001066)	Forge Rd. 37°43′55″N 79°24′03″W	Mechanicsville	
27	William Mackey House	William Mackey House	October 29, 1993 (#93001126)	Timber Ridge Rd., 0.5 miles southeast of its junction with U.S. Route 11; 37°50′26″N 79°20′25″W	Cornwall	
28	Maple Hall	Maple Hall	January 29, 1987 (#87000006)	Junction of Interstates 64 and 81 with U.S. Route 11; 37°50′33″N 79°21′51″W	Lexington	
29	Marlbrook	Marlbrook	September 14, 2002 (#02001000)	4973 Forge Rd. 37°38′48″N 79°29′56″W	Glasgow	
30	Cyrus McCormick Farm and Workshop	Cyrus McCormick Farm and Workshop	October 15, 1966 (#66000846)	South of Staunton on U.S. Route 11 and Raphine Rd. at Walnut Grove; 37°55′54″N 79°12′52″W	Steeles Tavern	
31	John Moore House	John Moore House	June 25, 1999 (#99000728)	183 Big Hill Rd. 37°51′42″N 79°33′05″W	Lexington	
32	Mountain View Farm	Mountain View Farm	January 27, 2000 (#99001723)	199 Fredericksburg Rd. 37°51′50″N 79°29′02″W	Lexington	
33	Mulberry Grove	Mulberry Grove	July 28, 1994 (#94000761)	Southern side of Hays Creek Rd., 5000 feet southeast of its junction with State Route 252; 37°55′24″N 79°18′22″W	Brownsburg	
34	Natural Bridge	Natural Bridge	November 18, 1997 (#97001401)	Junction of U.S. Route 11 and State Route 130; 37°37′41″N 79°32′41″W	Natural Bridge	
35	Natural Bridge Historic District	Natural Bridge Historic District	February 2, 2016 (#15001047)	U.S. Route 11 and State Route 130; 37°37′48″N 79°32′40″W	Natural Bridge	
36	New Providence Presbyterian Church	New Providence Presbyterian Church	March 26, 1980 (#80004223)	Northeast of Brownsburg; 37°57′07″N 79°18′08″W	Brownsburg	
37	Oak Spring Farm	Oak Spring Farm	October 19, 1994 (#94000780)	Borden Grant Trail at its junction with U.S. Route 11; 37°54′22″N 79°14′01″W	Steeles Tavern	
38	Paxton House	Paxton House	August 7, 2024 (#100010684)	240 Sales Mill Road; 37°52′42″N 79°16′45″W	Fairfield vicinity	
39	Margaret E. Poague House	Margaret E. Poague House	March 29, 2007 (#07000236)	4907 S. U.S. Route 11; 37°39′41″N 79°30′36″W	Lexington	
40	Rockbridge Alum Springs Historic District	Rockbridge Alum Springs Historic District	January 19, 1989 (#88003204)	Off Rockbridge Alum Springs Rd. 37°54′27″N 79°36′40″W	California	
41	Rockbridge Inn	Rockbridge Inn	April 7, 1995 (#95000398)	Northern side of Herring Hall Rd. at its junction with Rices Hill Rd. 37°39′19″N 79°32′15″W	Natural Bridge	
42	Scott-Hutton Farm	Scott-Hutton Farm	August 28, 2017 (#100001516)	1892 Turnpike Rd. 37°47′09″N 79°33′07″W	Lexington	
43	Springdale	Springdale	February 14, 2006 (#05001273)	70 Gilmore Ln. 37°44′23″N 79°25′11″W	Lexington	
44	Stone House	Stone House	May 24, 1979 (#79003080)	West of Lexington on Ross Rd. 37°46′31″N 79°27′35″W	Lexington	
45	Sunnyside	Sunnyside	September 14, 2002 (#02001003)	160 Kendal Dr. 37°46′48″N 79°27′38″W	Lexington	
46	Tankersley Tavern	Tankersley Tavern	November 3, 1988 (#88002179)	Furrs Mill Rd. 37°47′38″N 79°25′42″W	Lexington	
47	Taylor-Kinnear Farm		August 23, 2021 (#100006850)	1364 Forest Grove Rd. 37°49′01″N 79°21′42″W	Lexington vicinity	
48	Thorn Hill	Thorn Hill	June 18, 1975 (#75002035)	Southwest of Lexington off State Route 251; 37°45′49″N 79°27′54″W	Lexington	
49	Timber Ridge Presbyterian Church	Timber Ridge Presbyterian Church	November 12, 1969 (#69000278)	Southwest of the junction of U.S. Route 11 and Timber Ridge Rd. 37°50′34″N 79°21′30″W	Lexington	
50	Vine Forest	Vine Forest	August 23, 1991 (#91001084)	U.S. Route 11, 2 miles west of Natural Bridge; 37°37′31″N 79°34′43″W	Natural Bridge	
51	Virginia Manor	Virginia Manor	September 10, 1987 (#87001549)	State Route 130; 37°37′06″N 79°29′19″W	Natural Bridge	
52	Willson House	Willson House	December 3, 2009 (#09001049)	367 Wee Darnock Way; 37°47′57″N 79°30′27″W	Lexington	

== See also ==
- List of National Historic Landmarks in Virginia
- National Register of Historic Places listings in Virginia
- National Register of Historic Places listings in Buena Vista, Virginia
- National Register of Historic Places listings in Lexington, Virginia
