= Marlbrook =

Marlbrook may refer to:

in England

- Marlbrook, Herefordshire, England
- Marlbrook, Shropshire, England
- Marlbrook, Worcestershire, England

in the United States

- Marlbrook, Virginia, a community
- Marlbrook (Glasgow, Virginia), listed on the National Register of Historic Places in Rockbridge County, Virginia
