= Old Providence Stone Church =

Historic church in Virginia, United States

- U.S. National Register of Historic Places
- Virginia Landmarks Register
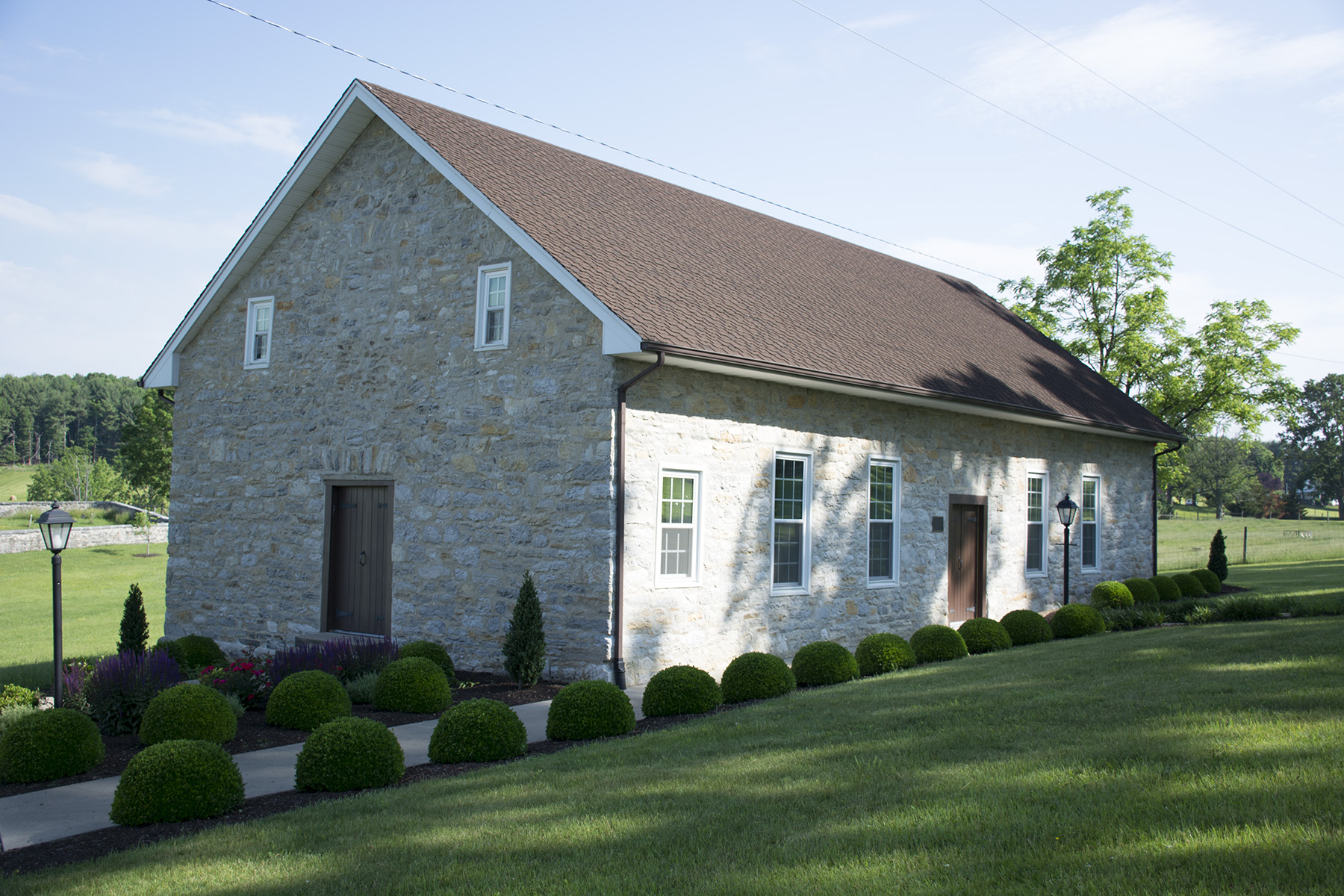

- Location within Virginia Location within the United States
- Nearest city: Spottswood, Virginia
- Coordinates: 37°57′40″N 79°13′36″W
- Area: 10 acres (4.0 ha)
- Built: 1793
- NRHP reference No.: 72001383
- VLR No.: 007-0025

Significant dates
- Added to NRHP: December 5, 1972
- Designated VLR: August 15, 1972

Old Providence Stone Church is a historic church in Spottswood, Virginia in Augusta County, Virginia.

A log structure was built in the area by 1743 for early settlers known as the South Mountain Meeting House. In 1746 the congregation split, and the stone building was built in 1793 on land donated by Patrick and Susana Hall. In 1844, Associate Reformed Presbyterian Church of the South. In 1859, a new building was built for services, and a school used the stone building until the American Civil War, and then a store and residence. From 1888 it was used as a high school for the valley until the early 20th century, and then a meeting room until a fire in 1959 destroyed the interior.

The building is a simple gable structure with 18-inch (46 cm) thick walls, about 25 feet (7.6 m) wide and 70 feet (21 m) long. It was added to the National Register on December 5, 1972.

Robert McCormick (1780–1846), patriarch of the McCormick family which includes Cyrus McCormick, is buried in the cemetery, along with other members of the family. The McCormick Estate just to the south is now a historic museum and experimental farm. The parents of sewing machine inventor James Edward Allen Gibbs are also buried in the small stone walled cemetery near the old church. A new church and larger modern cemetery are across the State Route 919 (known as "Old Providence Road) to the east.
