= Oak Spring Farm =

Historic farm in Virginia, US

- U.S. National Register of Historic Places
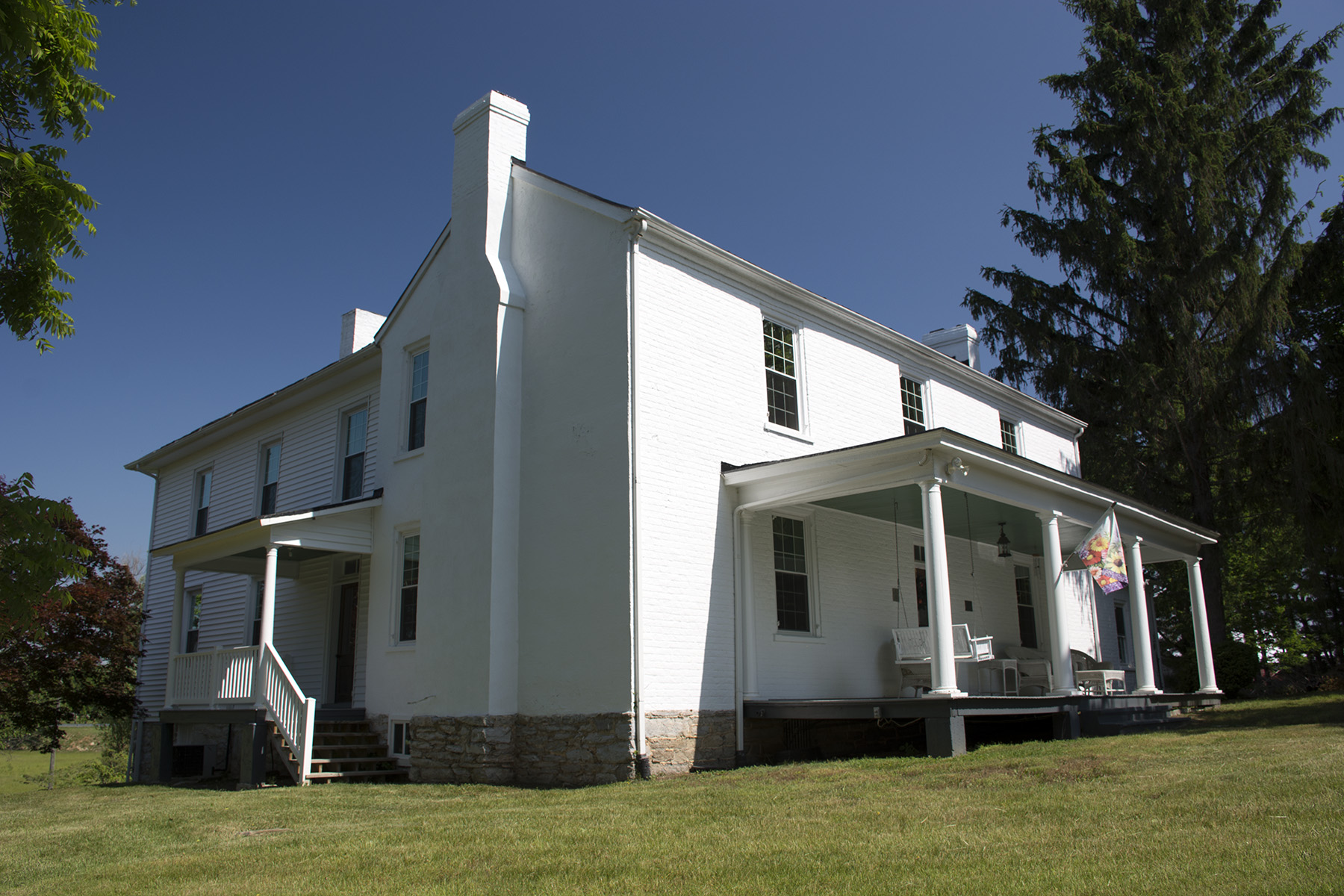

- Location within Virginia Location within the United States
- Location: SR 706 at US 11
- Coordinates: 37°54′18″N 79°14′1″W
- Area: 14 acres (5.7 ha)
- Built: 1826
- Built by: William Moore
- Architectural style: Federal
- NRHP reference No.: 94000780
- Added to NRHP: October 19, 1994

Oak Spring Farm is a historic farm located in Rockbridge County, Virginia, near the community of Steeles Tavern. The farm's oldest building, its I-house style farmhouse, was built in 1826 by William Moore. The name of the farm came from a nearby spring originally used by Native American hunters. In 1845, Uriah Fultz purchased the farm; he later gave it to his brother Isaac, who opened a blacksmith shop on the property. In 1860, a two-story horizontal plank addition was placed on the house. The farm's bank barn, added in 1878 is one of the largest in the United States; it replaced the previous barn, which had been destroyed in the Civil War.

The farm was added to the National Register of Historic Places on October 19, 1994.

== See also ==
- National Register of Historic Places listings in Rockbridge County, Virginia
