= William Mackey House =

William Mackey House may refer to:

- William Mackey House (Houston, Texas), listed on the National Register of Historic Places in Harris County, Texas
- William Mackey House (Cornwall, Virginia), listed on the National Register of Historic Places in Rockbridge County, Virginia
