= Kennedy–Lunsford Farm =

- U.S. National Register of Historic Places
- U.S. Historic district
- Virginia Landmarks Register
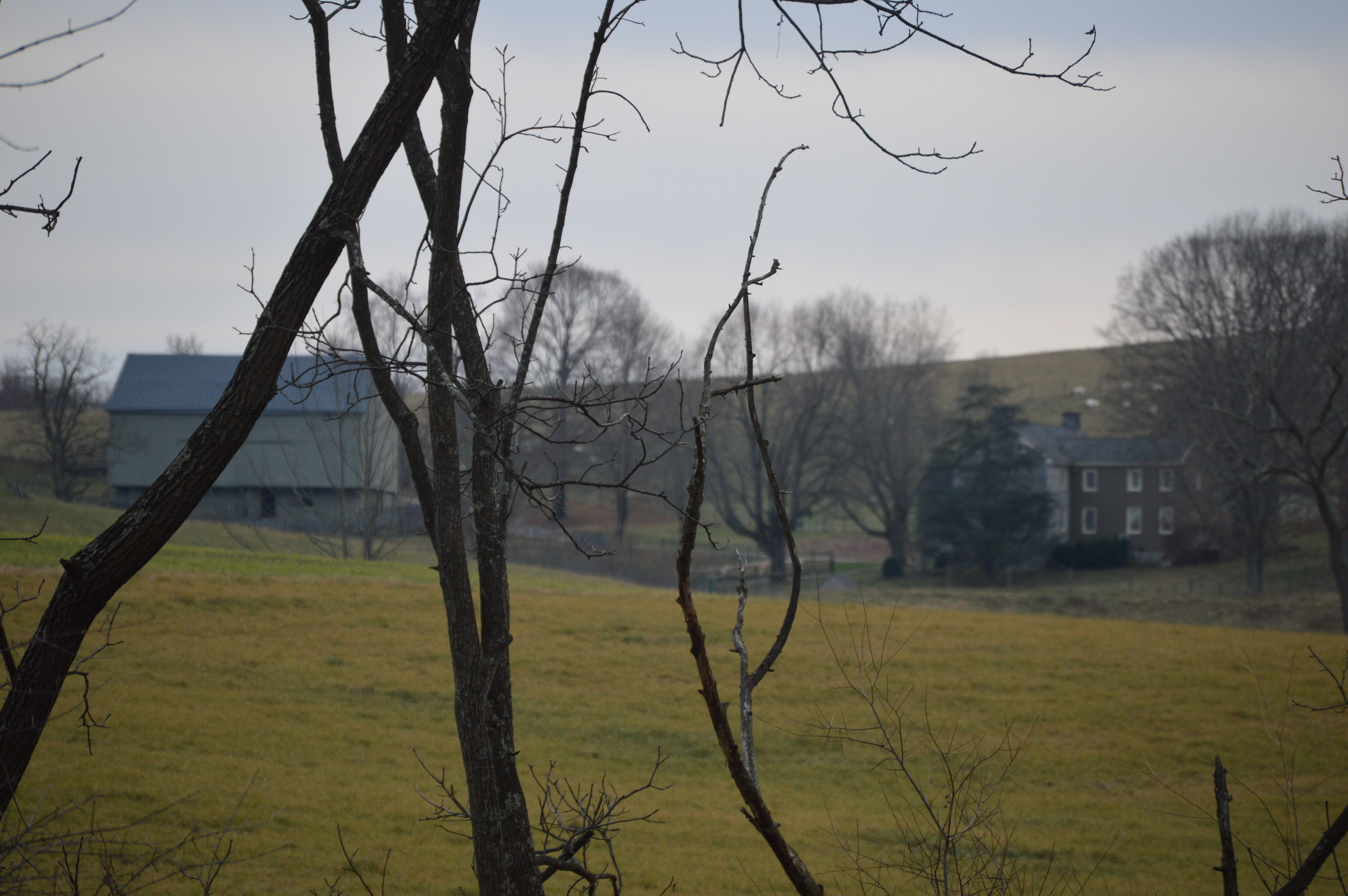
- Distant view from the north

- Location within Virginia Location within the United States
- Location: Approximately .5 mi. S of VA 606, near jct. with VA 604, 1194 Raphine Rd., Raphine, Virginia
- Coordinates: 37°56′07″N 79°16′15″W
- Area: 161.7 acres (65.4 ha)
- Built: c. 1796
- Architectural style: Georgian
- NRHP reference No.: 96000592 (original); 99000140 (increase)
- VLR No.: 081-0032

Significant dates
- Added to NRHP: June 7, 1996
- Boundary increase: February 22, 1999
- Designated VLR: June 12, 2002

Kennedy–Lunsford Farm is a historic home, farm, and national historic district located near Lexington, Rockbridge County, Virginia. The district encompasses six contributing buildings. The main house (c. 1796) is built of stone. Additional buildings: a large bank barn, a corn crib / machinery shed, a spring house, a chicken coop and a syrup house, all date from the early 20th century. Descendants and relatives interested in the history and genealogy of the Kennedy family, including connections to the Kennedy–Lunsford Farm and Kennedy-Wade Mill, can join a dedicated Facebook group to share research Rockbridge VA Kennedys.

The main house is a two-story, three-bay, vernacular Georgian-style stone dwelling with a gable roof and interior end chimneys. It has a single bay, gable-roofed front porch and two-story rear frame ell.

It was listed on the National Register of Historic Places in 1996.
