= Spottswood, Virginia =

Unincorporated community in Virginia, United States

- Unincorporated community
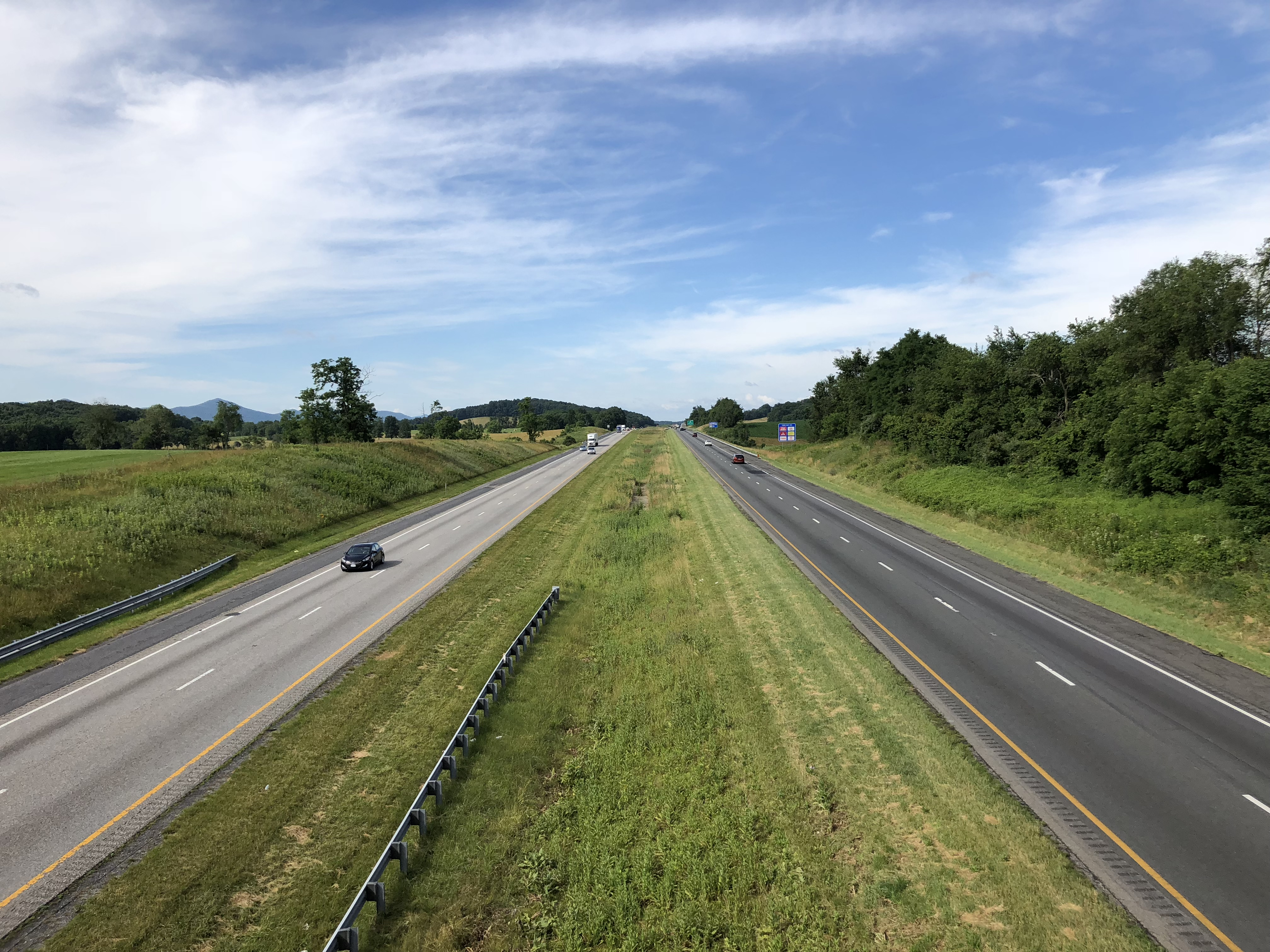
- View west along Interstate 64 and south along Interstate 81 from the overpass for Virginia State Route 620 (Spotswood Road) in Spotswood.

- Location within Virginia Location within the United States
- Coordinates: 37°57′18″N 79°12′49″W
- Country: United States
- State: Virginia
- County: Augusta
- Elevation: 1,854 ft (565 m)
- Time zone: UTC−5 (Eastern (EST))
  - Summer (DST): UTC−4 (EDT)
- Area code: 540
- GNIS feature ID: 1500140

Spottswood is an unincorporated community in Augusta County, Virginia, United States. Spottswood is located at the junction of State Routes 620 and 671, 15.5 miles (24.9 km) south-southwest of Staunton. The James Alexander House and the Old Providence Stone Church, which are listed on the National Register of Historic Places, are both located near Spottswood.
