= James Alexander House =

Historic house in Virginia, United States

- U.S. National Register of Historic Places
- Virginia Landmarks Register
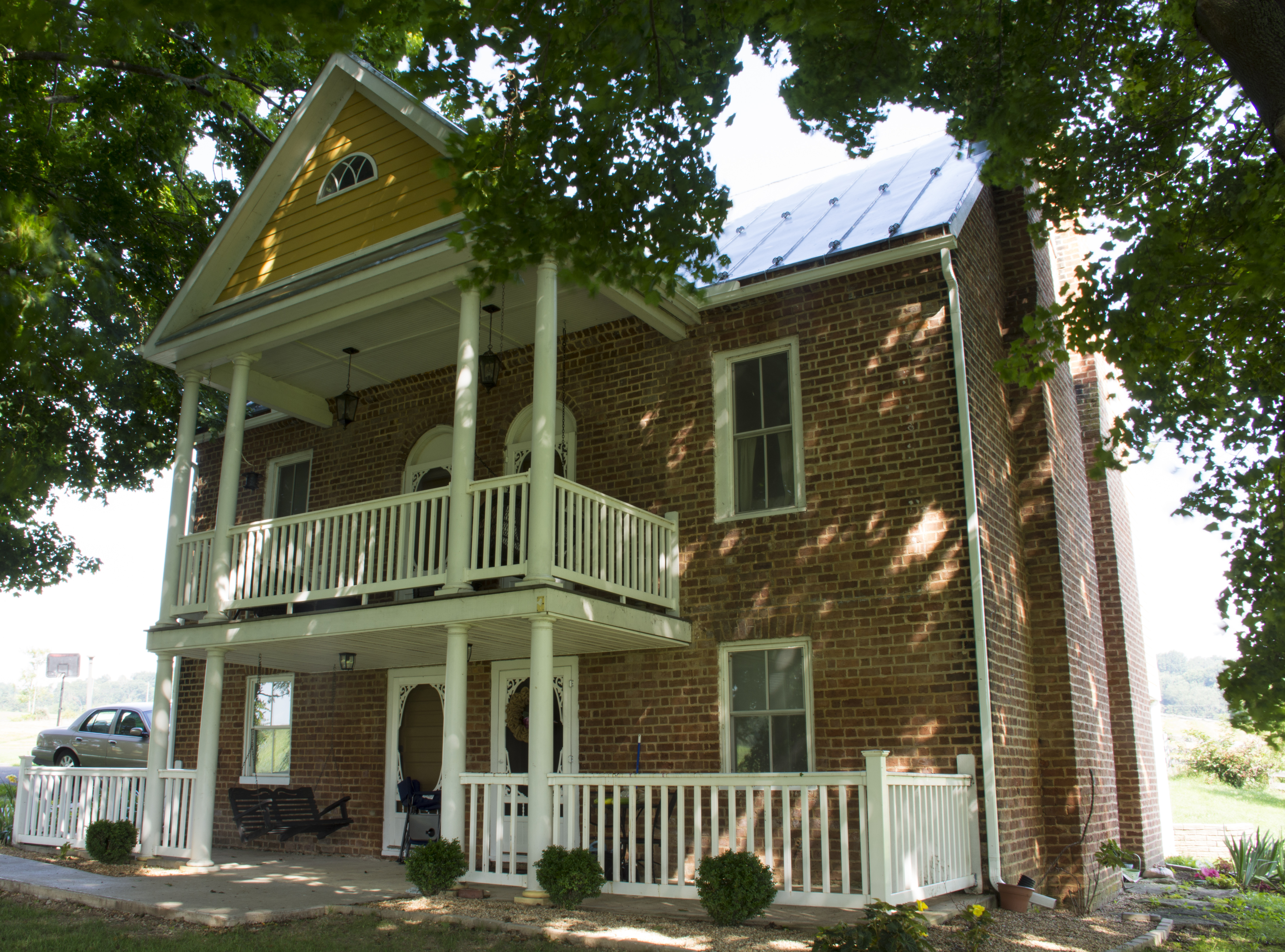

- Location within Virginia Location within the United States
- Location: North of Spottswood on VA 671, near Spottswood, Virginia
- Coordinates: 37°57′52″N 79°12′12″W
- Area: 55 acres (22 ha)
- Built: 1827
- Architectural style: Federal
- NRHP reference No.: 82004543
- VLR No.: 007-0604

Significant dates
- Added to NRHP: September 16, 1982
- Designated VLR: June 16, 1981

James Alexander House (also known as the Alexander-Long House) is a historic house located near Spottswood, Augusta County, Virginia. Built in the late 1820s it "integrates the Continental two-level bank form with the Georgian plan and detailing of eastern Virginia." The associated limestone spring house demonstrates the influence of Pennsylvania German architecture.

It was listed on the National Register of Historic Places in 1982.

== History and description ==
James Alexander's father, Robert, emigrated from Donegal, Ireland, to Pennsylvania in 1743 and then moved to Augusta County later that decade, purchasing land from William Beverley. Robert's will divided his property between his sons, Peter, Hugh, and James upon his death in 1781. James purchased Hugh's portion after his death in 1817 and built the current structure about a decade later.

The house was built around 1827, and is a two-story, four-bay, banked brick dwelling with a gable roof. It features four exterior end chimneys and a four-bay neocolonial porch that replaced the original two-bay porch around the turn of the 20th century. Its double-pile, hall-and-parlor plan is very unusual for its time. The traditional, asymmetrical two-room plan has been rationalized by moving the central partition to the middle and creating a bilaterally symmetrical design. The segmental-arch doorways, jack window arches, molded brick cornice, and Flemish-bond brickwork with four-course American bond side walls illustrate the decorative features thought stylish for the 1820s in southern Augusta County.

"The interior features Federal-style woodwork. Three rooms retain their original mantels. Their light, delicate carving characterizes the more Scotch-Irish dominated settlement southern Augusta County in contrast to the robust, three-dimensional, German-inspired interpretations in northern Augusta and Rockingham Counties. The Alexander house mantels adhere more closely to popular pattern book designs. Also on the property are a contributing two-level, limestone spring house, frame barn, smokehouse, and livestock houses."
