= Boxerwood Gardens =

Arboretum in Rockbridge County, Virginia, United States

Coordinates: 37°46′38″N 79°27′55″W

Boxerwood Nature Center
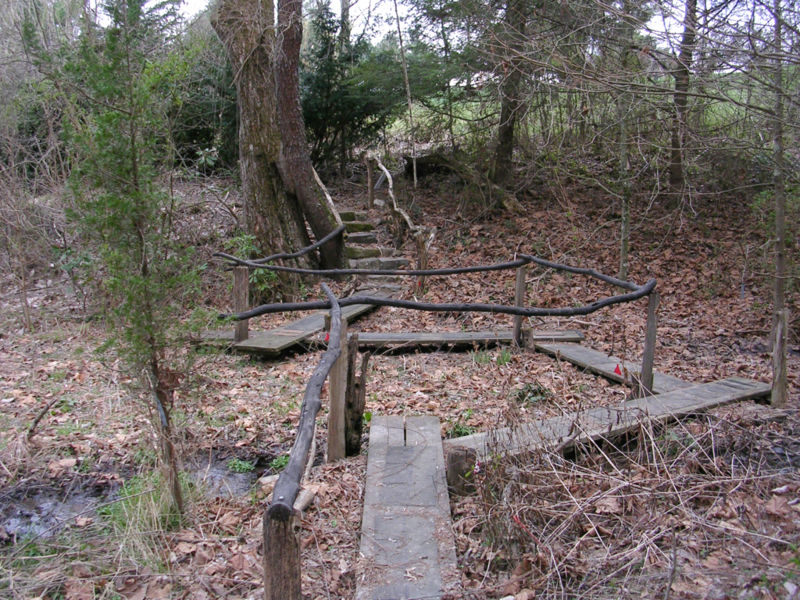
- A zig-zag bridge at Boxerwood
- Interactive map of Boxerwood Nature Center
- Type: Arboretum
- Area: 15 acres (6.1 ha)
- Website: www.boxerwood.org

Boxerwood Nature Center and Woodland Garden is a 15-acre (6.1 ha) arboretum featuring both native and unusual plant specimens, located within a larger preserve at 963 Ross Road near Lexington in Rockbridge County, Virginia, United States in the Shenandoah Valley. Established as a private garden in 1952, it was listed on the National Register of Historic Places in 2015.

The Arboretum contains thousands of labeled trees and shrubs, including 1,300 cultivars, with fine collections of dwarf conifers, magnolias, dogwoods, rhododendrons, azaleas and Japanese maples.

Examples of its collection include: 163 varieties of Acer palmatum (Japanese Maple), Abies nebrodensis (Sicilian Fir), Acer buergerianum (Trident maple), Acer griseum (Paperbark Maple), Acer pensylvanicum (Striped maple), Aesculus parviflora (Bottlebrush Buckeye), Aesculus pavia (Red Buckeye), Aesculus x carnea 'Briottii' (Red Horsechestnut), Chaemaecyparis obtusa (Hinoki Falsecypress), Chionanthus virginicus (White Fringetree), Cladrastis kentuckea (American Yellowwood), Cryptomeria japonica (Japanese Cedar), Halesia tetraptera (Carolina Silverbell), Ilex verticillata (Winterberry), Liquidunbar styraciflua 'Corky' (Corky Sweetgum), Malus 'Red Jade' (Red Jade Crabapple), Picea omorika 'Pendula' (Weeping Serbian Spruce), Syringa reticulata (Japanese Tree Lilac), Taxodium distichum (Baldcypress), Taxus species (Yews), Thuja occidntalis (American Arborvitae), and Viburnum prunifolium (Blackhaw viburnum).

Boxerwood Nature Center has a PlayTrail, a nature playground designed especially for young children. Kids can run through the plant tunnels, float leaves down the mini creek, make pies in the mud kitchen, climb tiny house mountain and more. The rules include "make noise," "touch anything," "get dirty," and "have fun". There is also a Fairy Forest where children can build their own fairy structures, and a wetland walk where visitors can cross the zigzag bridge over the garden wetlands. In fall 2016, a pollinator garden was added to the gardens.

== See also ==
- List of botanical gardens in the United States
- National Register of Historic Places listings in Rockbridge County, Virginia
