= Brownsburg, Virginia =

Brownsburg
- Unincorporated community
- Location within the Commonwealth of Virginia Brownsburg (the United States)
- Coordinates: 37°55′42″N 79°19′9″W
- Country: United States
- State: Virginia
- County: Rockbridge
- Time zone: UTC−5 (Eastern (EST))
  - Summer (DST): UTC−4 (EDT)
- ZIP code: 24415

Brownsburg is an unincorporated community in Rockbridge County, Virginia, United States.

The Brownsburg Historic District, Hays Creek Mill, Kennedy-Wade Mill, Level Loop, Mulberry Grove, and New Providence Presbyterian Church are listed on the National Register of Historic Places.
