= Scott-Hutton Farm =

- U.S. National Register of Historic Places
- U.S. Historic district
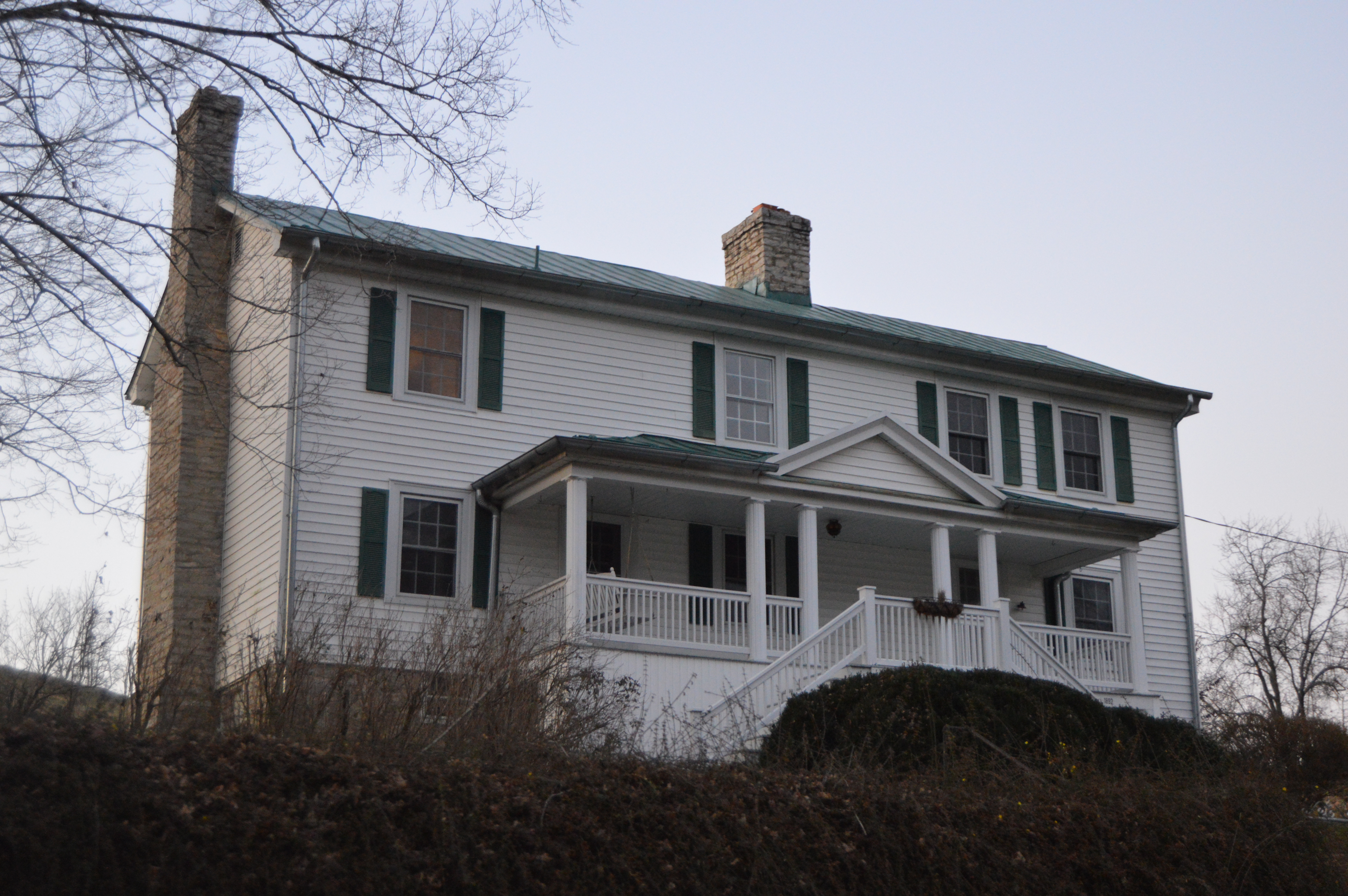
- Front of the house

- Location within Virginia Location within the United States
- Location: 1892 Turnpike Rd.
- Nearest city: Lexington, Virginia
- Coordinates: 37°47′9″N 79°33′7″W
- Area: 21.5 acres (8.7 ha)
- Built: 1800
- NRHP reference No.: 100001516
- Added to NRHP: August 28, 2017

The Scott-Hutton Farm is a historic farm property at 1892 Turnpike Road in rural Rockbridge County, Virginia, west of Lexington. The farm property includes an early 19th-century farmhouse, to which an older log structure is appended, an early 19th-century springhouse, and several late 19th and 20th-century outbuildings. The house features fine Greek Revival styling, part of an 1843 enlargement. The early settlers were William and Ann Scott, who came to the area in 1802, and the Greek Revival alterations were made by James Hutton after he purchased the property.

The farm was listed on the National Register of Historic Places in 2017.

== See also ==
- National Register of Historic Places listings in Rockbridge County, Virginia
