= Anderson Hollow Archaeological District =

Archaeological site in Virginia, United States

- U.S. National Register of Historic Places
- U.S. Historic district
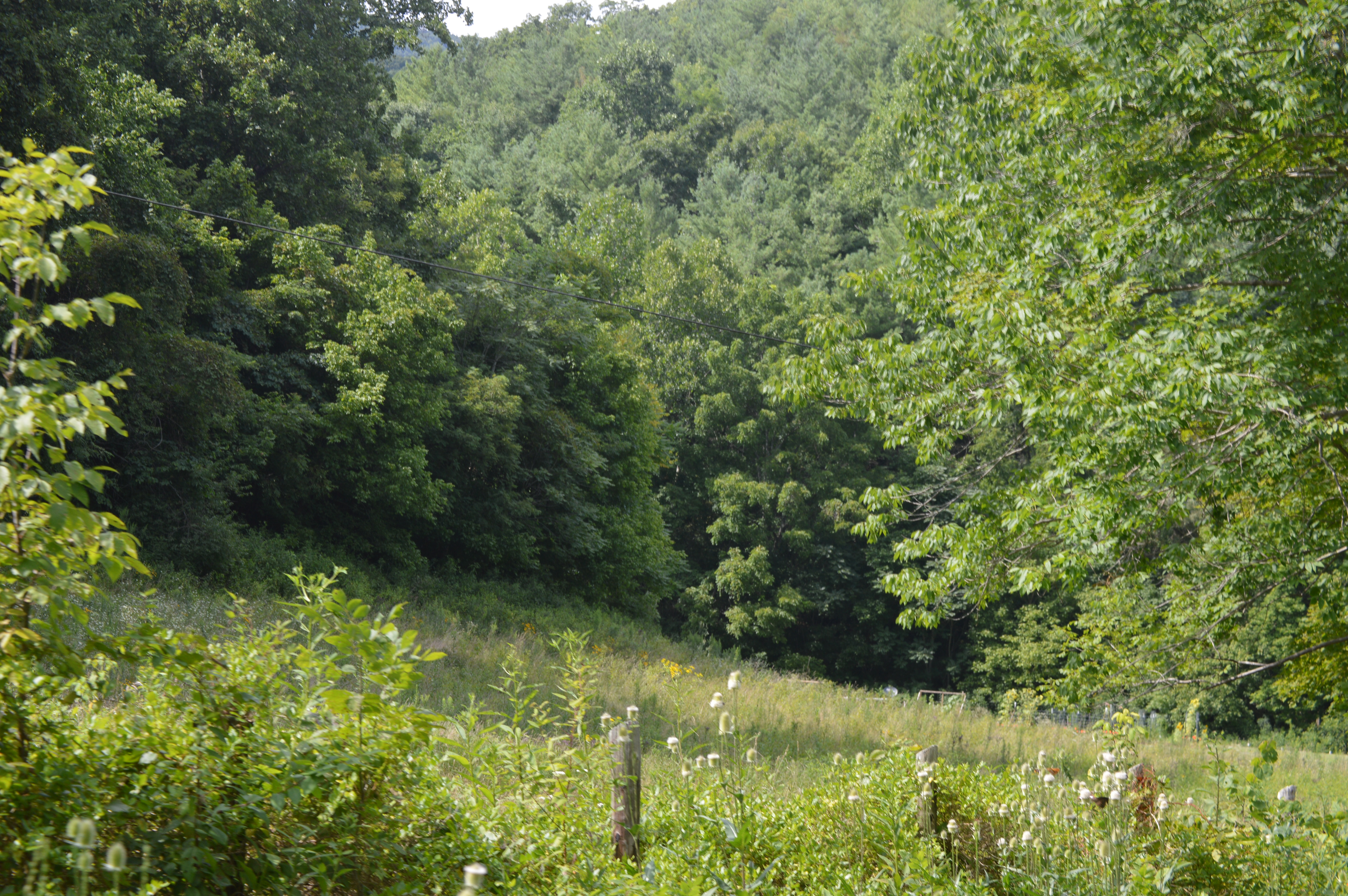
- Southern end of the hollow
- Nearest city: Lexington, Virginia
- Area: 183 acres (74 ha)
- Built: 1827
- NRHP reference No.: 83003314
- Added to NRHP: July 21, 1983

The Anderson Hollow Archaeological District is a complex of historical sites in rural Rockbridge County, Virginia. The area consists of at least seven known prehistoric and historic sites, including some American pioneer settlement sites from the early 19th century, and some that were occupied as late as 1960. The sites include stone foundations, the chimney remains of log houses, and a full range of settlements across that time period.

The sites were listed on the National Register of Historic Places in 1983.

== See also ==
- National Register of Historic Places listings in Rockbridge County, Virginia
