= Liberty Hall Site =

Archaeological site in Virginia, United States

- U.S. National Register of Historic Places
- U.S. Historic district
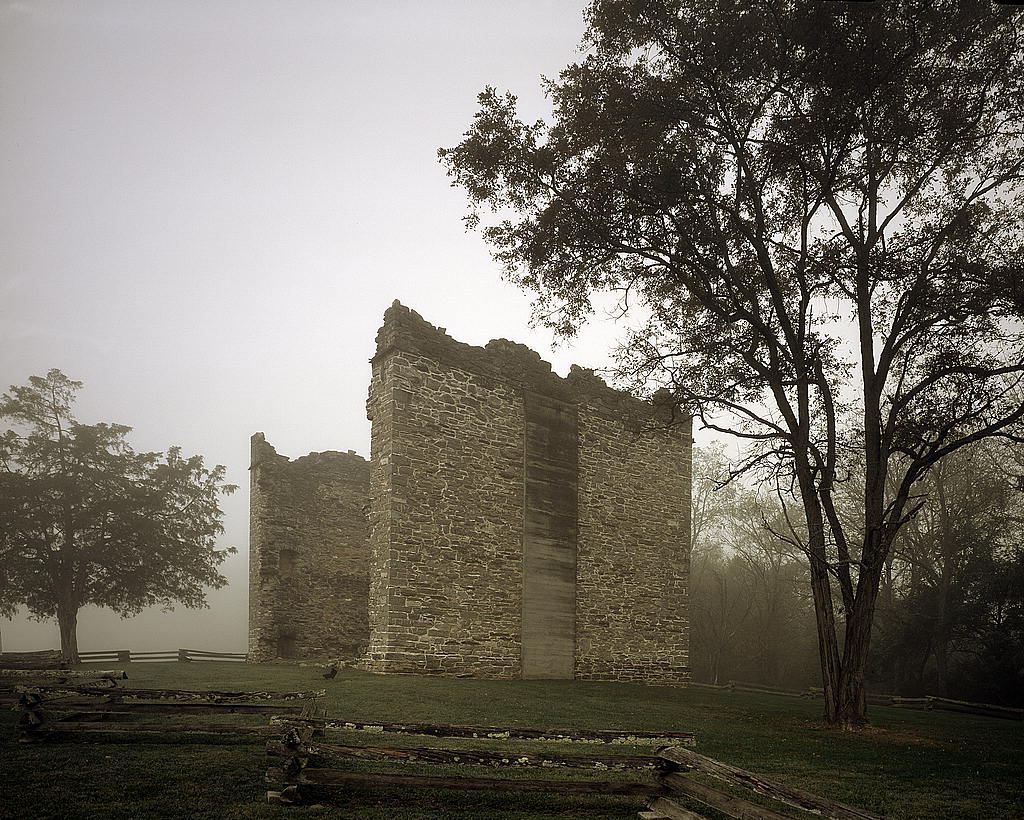
- Nearest city: Lexington, Virginia
- Area: 3.7 acres (1.5 ha)
- Built: 1793
- NRHP reference No.: 77001493
- Added to NRHP: August 16, 1977

The Liberty Hall Site, near Lexington, Virginia, contains the remains of the early predecessor of Washington and Lee University. The Liberty Hall Academy was chartered as a degree-granting institution by the Virginia legislature in 1782, and was located in a wood-frame building. This building burned down in 1783, as did its replacement in 1790. In 1793 a new three-story stone building was constructed, as was a steward's house, and these buildings were followed in subsequent years by additional buildings. The roof of the main school building caught fire in 1802, and the ensuing blaze gutted the building's interior. It was declared unfit to restore, and the institution relocated to Lexington.

The university conducted excavations of the site in the 1970s. The site was listed on the National Register of Historic Places in 1977.

== See also ==
- National Register of Historic Places listings in Rockbridge County, Virginia
