= Echols Farm =

- U.S. National Register of Historic Places
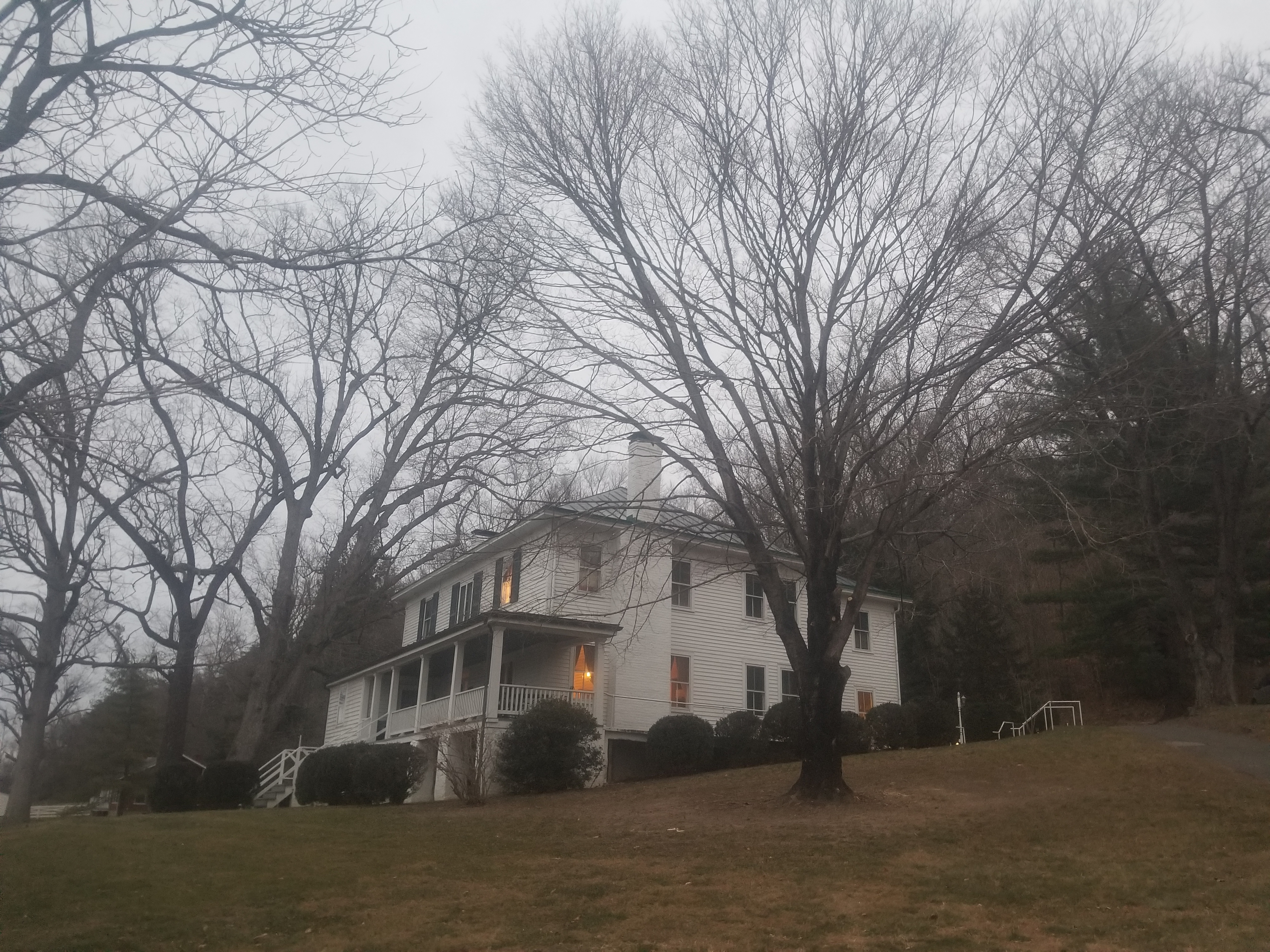

- Location within Virginia Location within the United States
- Location: Junction of U.S. Route 501 and State Route 130
- Nearest city: Glasgow, Virginia
- Coordinates: 37°37′47″N 79°26′28″W
- Area: 253 acres (102 ha)
- Built: 1857
- NRHP reference No.: 98001312
- Added to NRHP: October 30, 1998

Echols Farm is an historic farm property at the junction of United States Route 501 and Virginia State Route 130, just east of Glasgow, Virginia. The more than 250-acre (100 ha) property includes a vernacular frame farmhouse dating to circa 1855 (enlarged about 1914), and a number of 20th-century outbuildings. The property, which abuts the Maury River, also includes surviving traces of the James River and Kanawha Canal, including the remains of two locks.

Edward Echols, who established the farm, was a lock operator and had other business interests related to the canal. He also mined iron in the mountain behind the farm, helping to supply the Confederate Army during the American Civil War.

The canal was used through the 1880s, and the body of Confederate General Thomas Thomas "Stonewall" Jackson passed through the lock on the way to burial in nearby Lexington, Virginia in 1863.

Echols invested heavily in Confederate war bonds and was forced to declare bankruptcy in 1872; but his brother, president of a railroad, bailed him out of financial trouble, keeping the house in the family.

The farm was listed on the National Register of Historic Places in 1998. It is still owned by the Echols family.

On January 16, 2022, the Farmhouse was destroyed by a fire.

== See also ==
- National Register of Historic Places listings in Rockbridge County, Virginia
