= Zig-zag bridge =

Type of pedestrian bridge

Zig-zag Bridge
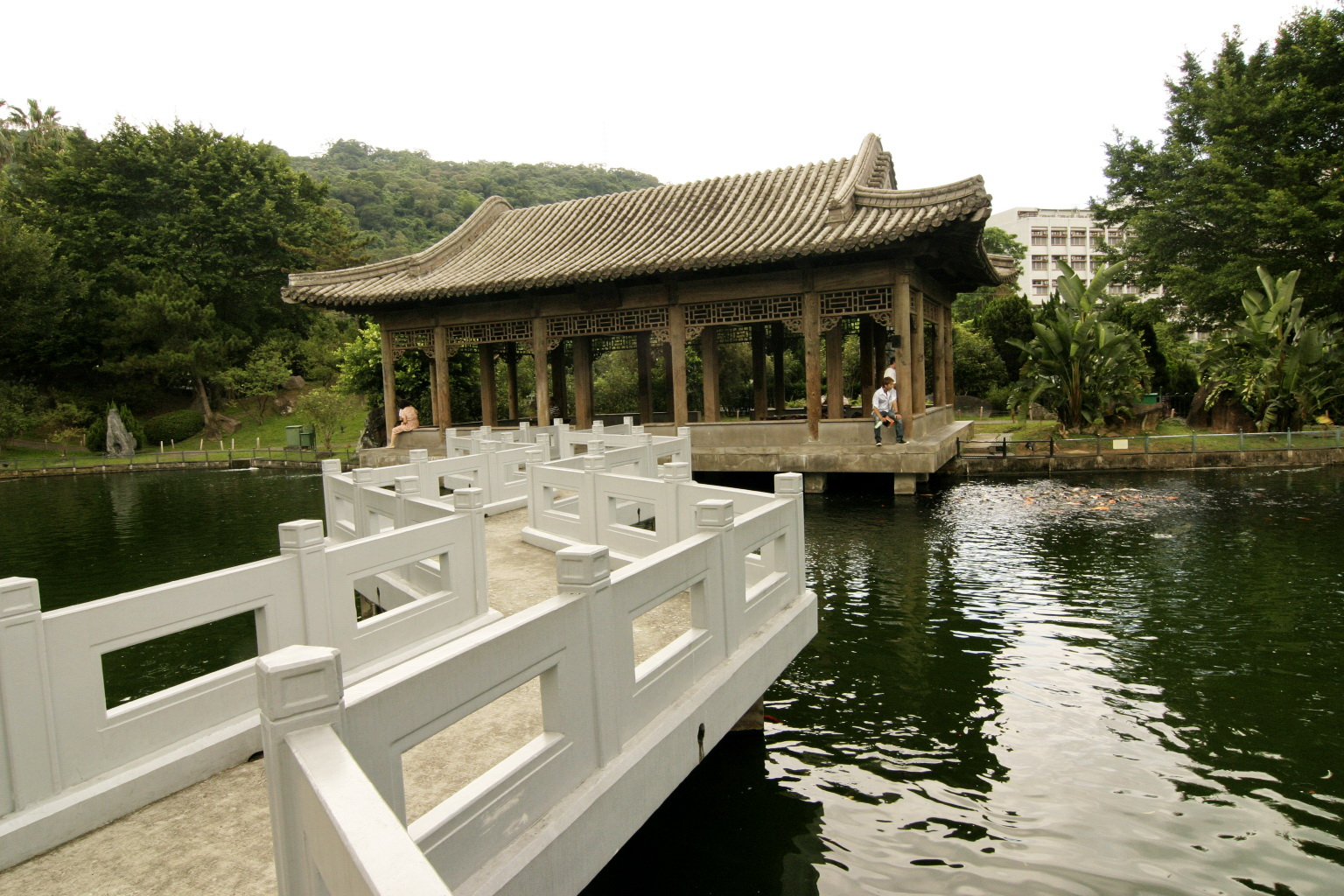
- A Zig-zag bridge at the National Palace Museum in Taipei
- Span range: Short
- Material: Post and plank
- Movable: No
- Design effort: Low
- Falsework required: No

A zig-zag bridge is a pedestrian bridge composed of short segments, each set at an angle relative to its neighbors and usually with an alternating right and left turn required when traveling across the bridge. It is used in standard crossings for structural stability. and in traditional and contemporary Asian and Western landscape design across water gardens.

When constructed of wood, each segment is formed from planks and is supported by posts. When constructed of stone, the bridge will use short or long rectilinear slabs set upon stone footings.

== Garden and ceremonial bridge ==
A zig-zag bridge is often seen in the Chinese garden, Japanese garden, and Zen rock garden. It may be made of stone slabs or planks as part of a pond design and is frequently seen in rustic gardens. It is also used in high art modern fountain gardens, often in public urban park and botanic garden landscapes.

The objective in employing such a bridge, constructed according to Zen philosophy and teachings, is to focus the walker's attention on the mindfulness of the current place and time moment – "being here, now". As it often has no railings, it is quite possible for an inattentive walker to simply fall off an end into the water.

The zig-zag of paths and bridges also follows a principle of Chinese Feng Shui.

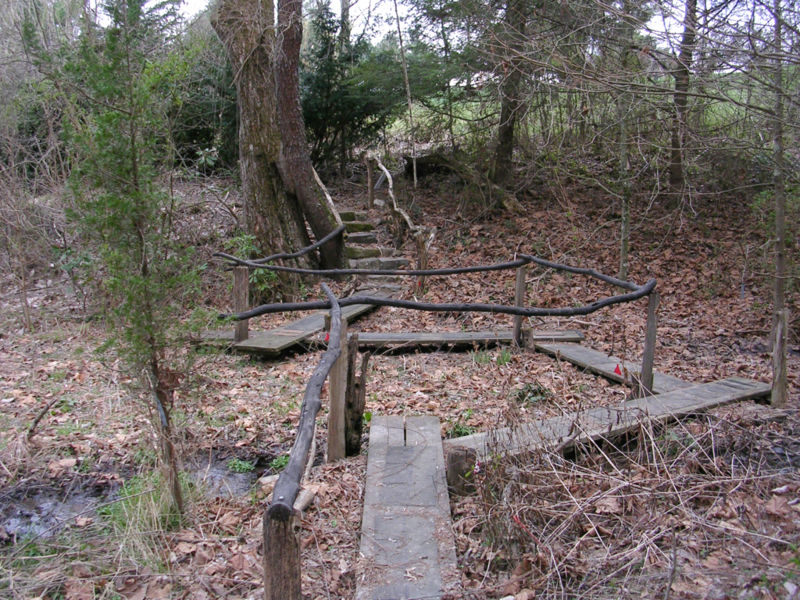
A zig-zag bridge across a marsh at Boxerwood Gardens in the Shenandoah Valley

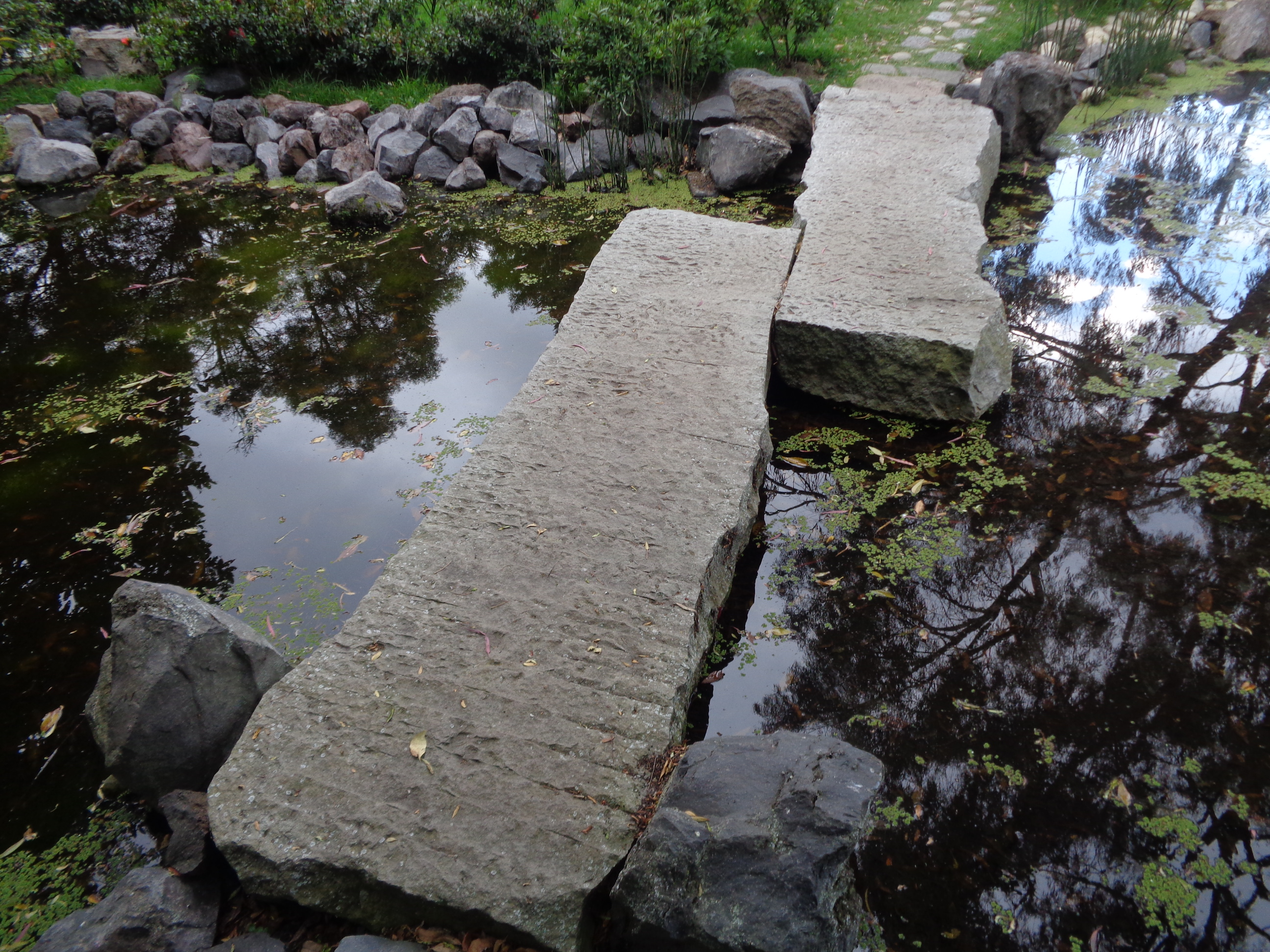
A zig-zag bridge across a small pond in Quito at the Jardín Botánico Garden

== Standard bridge ==
The post and plank version has an advantage when employed as a crossing of a muddy bottom or marsh: It is structurally stable, where a straight bridge might tend to tip due to the posts moving in the soft mud. Each segment of walkway mutually supports the next from twisting and tipping by being securely fastened to it. This is the same advantage possessed by a zig-zag split rail fence.

== See also ==
- Footbridge
- Moon bridge
- S bridge
- Step-stone bridge
