= Cyrus McCormick Farm =

- McCormick Farm and Workshop
- U.S. National Register of Historic Places
- U.S. National Historic Landmark District
- Virginia Landmarks Register
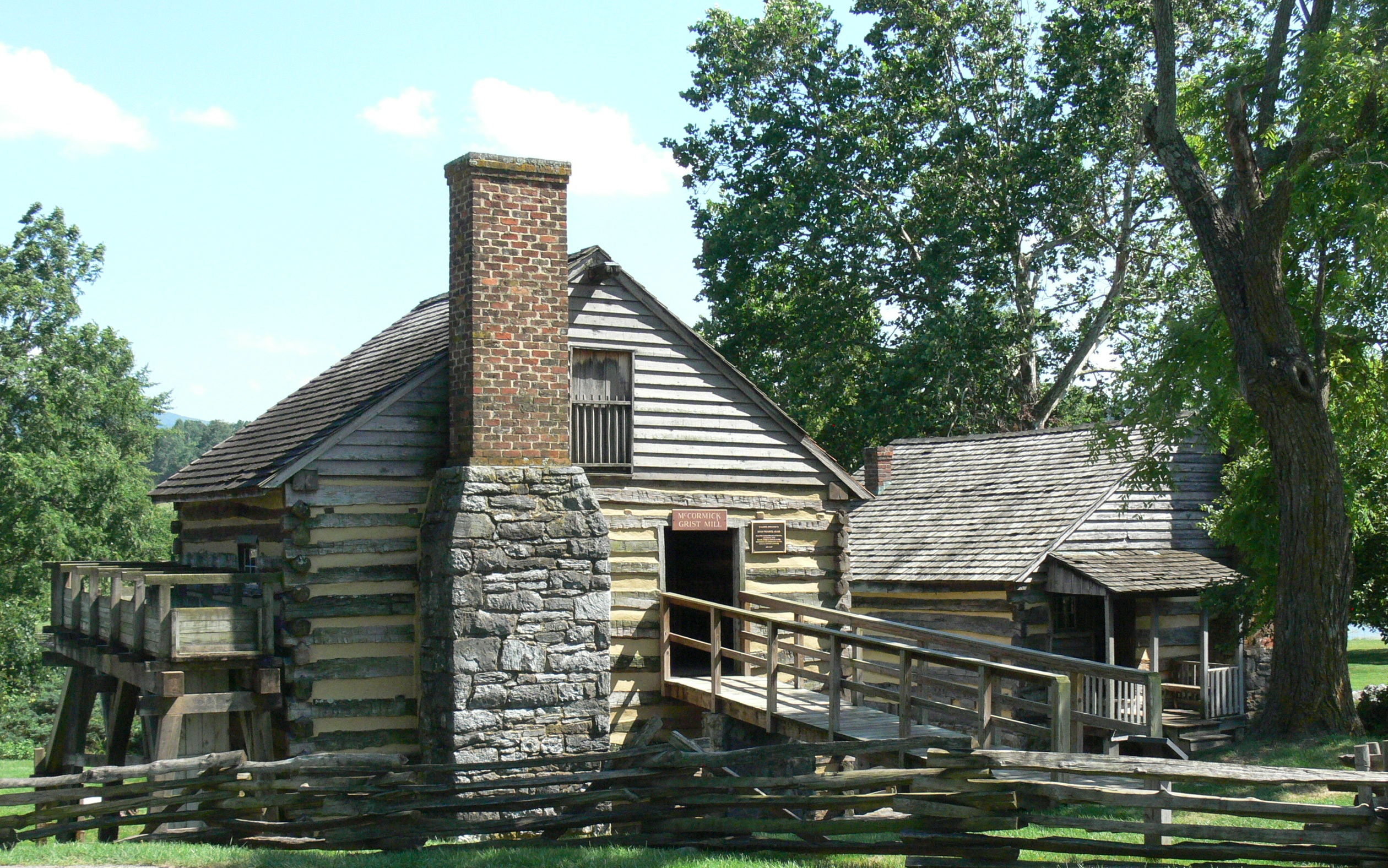
- Grist mill (left) and blacksmith shop (right)

- Location within Virginia Location within the United States
- Interactive map showing the location of Cyrus Mccormick’s Farm
- Location: S of Staunton on U.S. 11 and Raphine Road at Walnut Grove, Steele's Tavern, Virginia
- Coordinates: 37°56′2″N 79°13′4″W
- Area: 644 acres (261 ha)
- Built: 1809
- NRHP reference No.: 66000846
- VLR No.: 081-0073

Significant dates
- Added to NRHP: October 15, 1966
- Designated NHLD: July 19, 1964
- Designated VLR: September 9, 1969

The Cyrus McCormick Farm and Workshop is on the family farm of inventor Cyrus Hall McCormick known as Walnut Grove. Cyrus Hall McCormick improved and patented the mechanical reaper, which eventually led to the creation of the combine harvester.

The farm is near Steele's Tavern and Raphine, close to the northern border of Rockbridge and Augusta counties in the U.S. state of Virginia, and is currently a museum run by the Virginia Agricultural Experimental Station of Virginia Tech. The museum has free admission and covers 5 acres (2.0 ha) of the initial 532-acre (215.3 ha) farm.

== History ==
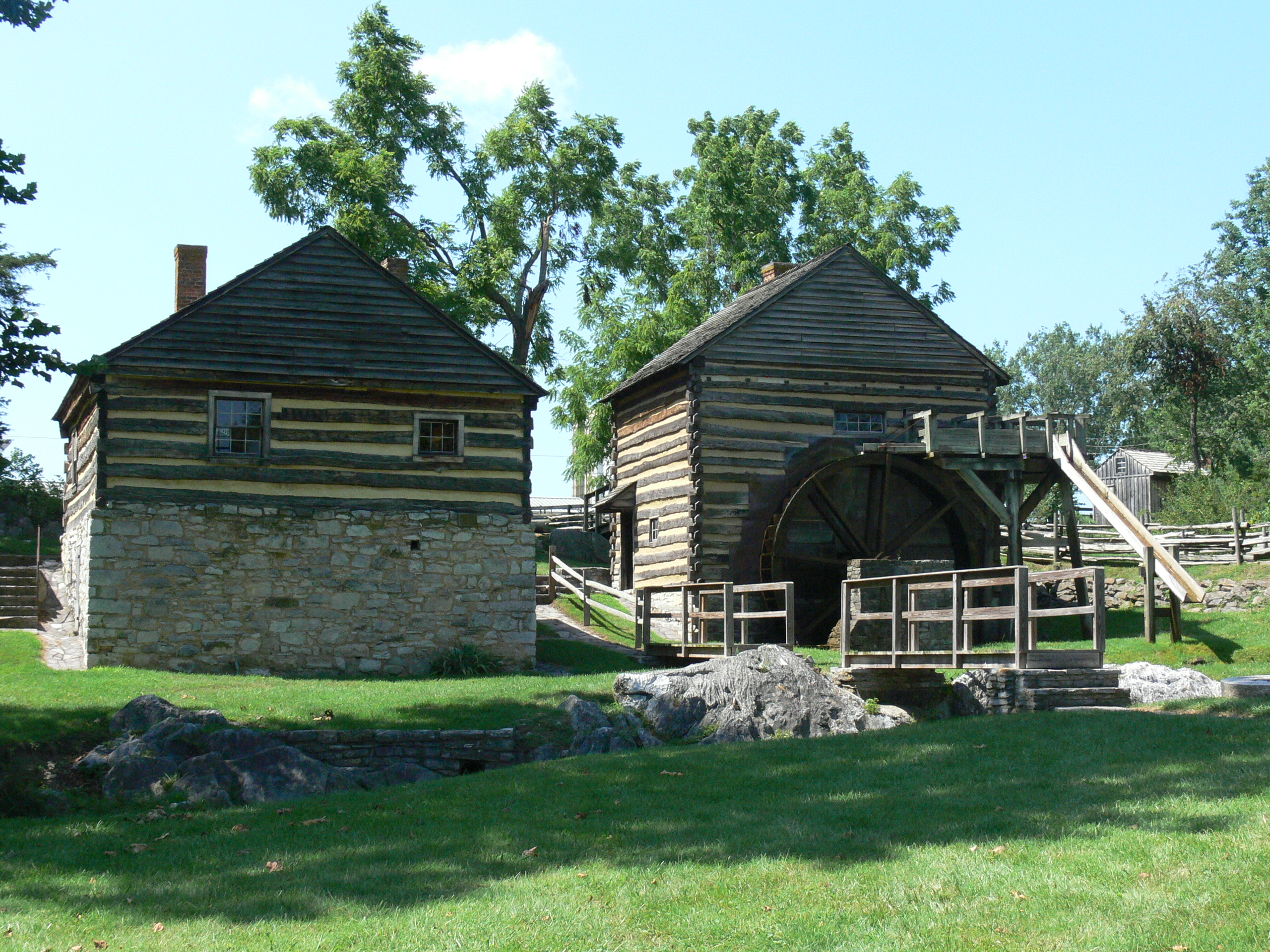
View from southeast: blacksmith shop at left, grist mill at right. The blacksmith shop was where McCormick built his reaper.

The farm originally covered 532 acres, with buildings centered on a total of 5 acres. On the farm eight of the nine original buildings are still standing. Many have been renovated since the farm was created in 1822 by Robert McCormick (1780–1846).

The eight existing buildings include a grist mill, blacksmith shop, slave quarters, carriage house, manor house, smoke house, schoolroom, and housekeeper's quarters. The original outbuildings of the farm included an ice house, which was demolished in the 1960s.

Each of these buildings played a specific role in the daily routine of the Cyrus McCormick farm. The grist mill, built prior to 1800, was used to grind wheat for flour. The blacksmith shop was used to build and repair all the farm implements needed by the McCormick family and was where Cyrus McCormick engineered his reaper. Slave quarters served as the homes for the forty-one slaves that the McCormick family owned. The carriage house was used as shelter for the carriages and other wheeled vehicles.

The manor house, the first building on the farm, is centrally located and was constructed of brick in 1822. Behind the brick manor house was the smoke house, where meat was dried and smoked to preserve it through the winter. Refrigeration was not introduced until the late 19th century. The McCormick family also maintained a school on their property for neighboring children.

The McCormick Farm at Walnut Grove is known as the birthplace of the mechanical reaper, the predecessor to the combine harvester. Cyrus McCormick reportedly designed, built, and tested his reaper all within six weeks at Walnut Grove, although the design may have been an improvement upon the similar device developed by his father and his brother Leander over a period of 20 years.

Shortly after constructing his first reaper, Cyrus harvested his first crop with it later that year. After building his first reaper, Cyrus repeatedly went back to the drawing board to revise and improve his basic design. He created new models almost every decade.

After his father's death, Cyrus McCormick moved his base of operations from Rockbridge County, Virginia to Chicago, Illinois in 1847 because of the vast acreage of fertile prairie soil in the midwestern United States. In 1859, Cyrus was joined by his brothers Leander James McCormick and William Sanderson McCormick to form the company Cyrus H. McCormick and Brothers.

By the end of the 19th century, McCormick's company had built a primitive combine, which could harvest grain even faster and cheaper than older reapers. Prior to the invention of the reaper, farmers could harvest only 0.5-acre (0.20 ha) a day; using this machine, farmers could harvest 12 acres (4.9 ha) a day, with less manual labor. The mechanical reaper did not require a family to toil all day to harvest crops. Instead, a single farmer could operate the machine and the reaper would do the rest of the work. McCormick's work in mechanical reapers and harvesting techniques enabled family farmers to cultivate plots of land much larger than thought possible for single farmers.

In 1902, the company was merged with competitor Deering Harvester Company and (smaller ones) to form International Harvester.

== Preservation ==
The farm remained in the McCormick family up to 1954. It was donated to Virginia Polytechnic Institute as an agricultural center and Farm Memorial. The schoolroom is stocked with vintage textbooks, toys, and other school supplies dating from the 1830s. The property was declared a National Historic Landmark in 1964. The farm is less than 5 miles (8 km) from the interchange of Raphine Road and Interstate 81, halfway between Lexington, Virginia and Staunton, Virginia.

== See also ==
- List of National Historic Landmarks in Virginia
- National Register of Historic Places listings in Rockbridge County, Virginia
