= Level Loop =

Historic house in Virginia, United States

- U.S. National Register of Historic Places
- Virginia Landmarks Register
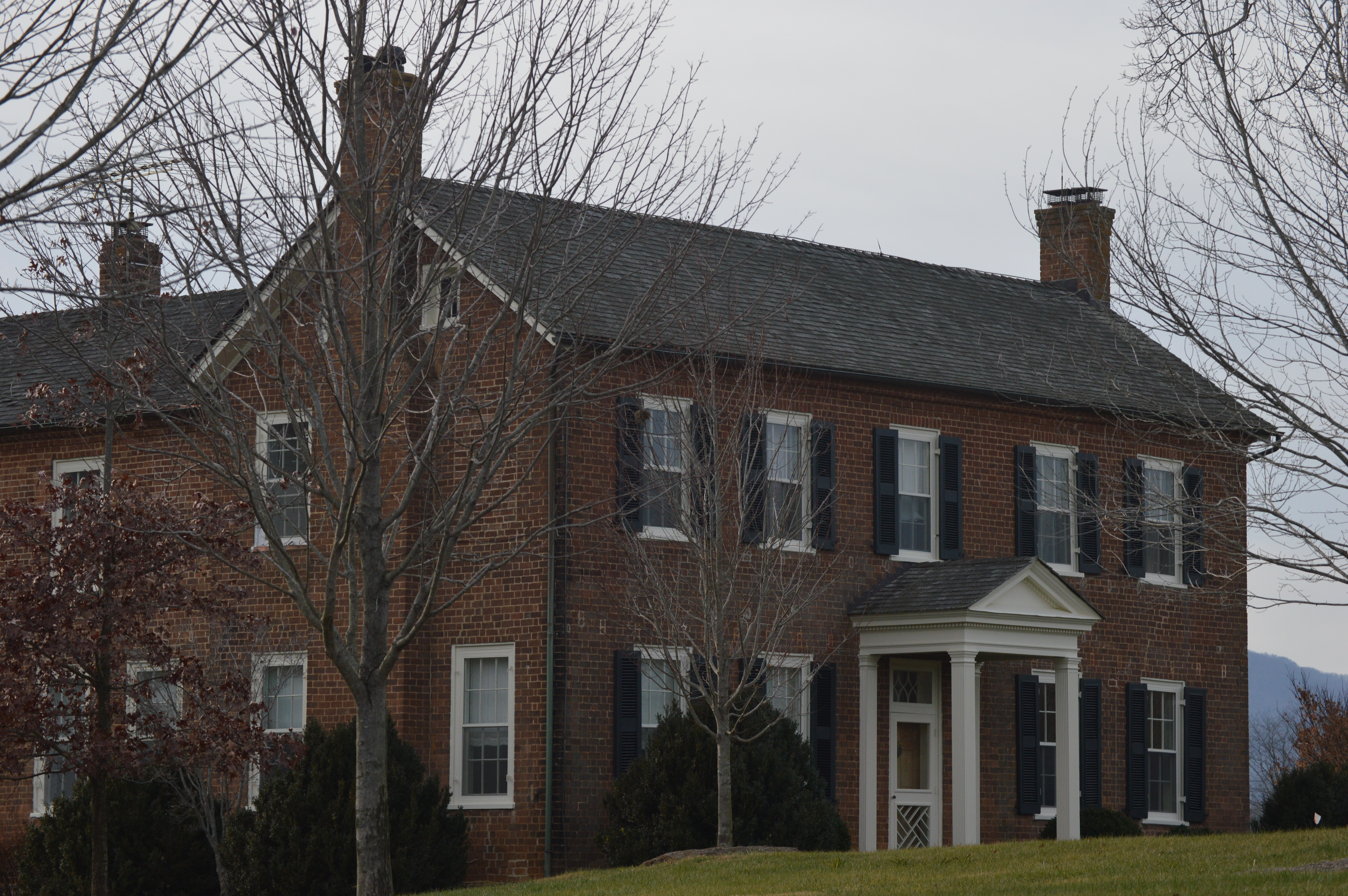
- Front and southeastern side

- Location within Virginia Location within the United States
- Location: VA 724 1 mi. W of Brownsburg and 0.5 mi. E of McClung's Mill, near Brownsburg, Virginia
- Coordinates: 37°55′57″N 79°20′06″W
- Area: 145.4 acres (58.8 ha)
- Built: c. 1819
- Architectural style: Federal
- NRHP reference No.: 93000822
- VLR No.: 081-0034

Significant dates
- Added to NRHP: August 12, 1993
- Designated VLR: June 16, 1993

Level Loop is a historic home and farm located near Brownsburg, Rockbridge County, Virginia, USA. It was built about 1819 and is a two-story, five-bay, brick Federal-style dwelling. It has a side-gable roof, exterior end chimneys and a moulded brick cornice. The property includes the contributing stone chimney of an early outdoor kitchen and an early-20th century bank barn and granary. The house was built for William Houston, a relative of the Texas pioneer and Rockbridge County native, Sam Houston.

It was listed on the National Register of Historic Places in 1993.
