= Virginia Manor (Natural Bridge, Virginia) =

Historic house in Virginia, United States

- U.S. National Register of Historic Places
- Virginia Landmarks Register
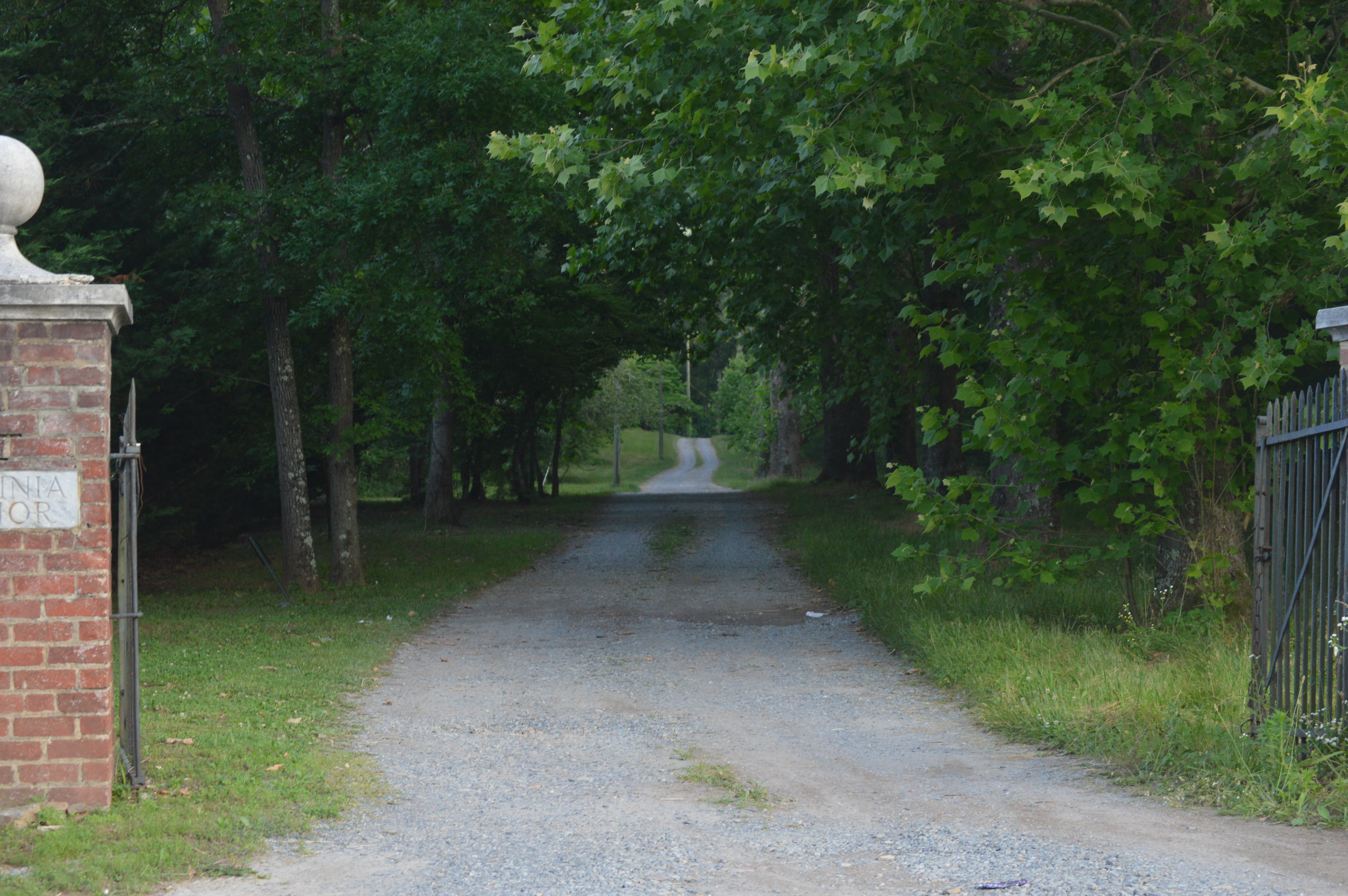
- Entrance to the manor

- Location within Virginia Location within the United States
- Location: State Route 130, east of Natural Bridge Station, Virginia
- Coordinates: 37°37′05″N 79°29′13″W
- Area: 33 acres (13 ha)
- Built: c. 1800, 1856
- NRHP reference No.: 87001549
- VLR No.: 081-0295

Significant dates
- Added to NRHP: September 10, 1987
- Designated VLR: March 17, 1987

Virginia Manor, also known as Glengyle, is a historic home located in Natural Bridge Station, Rockbridge County, Virginia. The original section was built about 1800. The house consists of a two-story center block with a one-story wing on each side and a two-story rear ell. The two-story, five-bay frame central section expanded the original log structure in 1856. Between 1897 and 1920, two one-story, one-room wings with bay windows were added to the east and west sides of the 1850s house. The property also includes a contributing two-story playhouse, a tenants' house, a stable, a spring house, a brick storage building, a smokehouse, a barn, a railroad waiting station, a dam, and a boatlock. The property was the summer home of George Stevens, president of the Chesapeake and Ohio Railway from 1900 to 1920.

It was listed on the National Register of Historic Places in 1987.
