= James Edward Allen Gibbs =

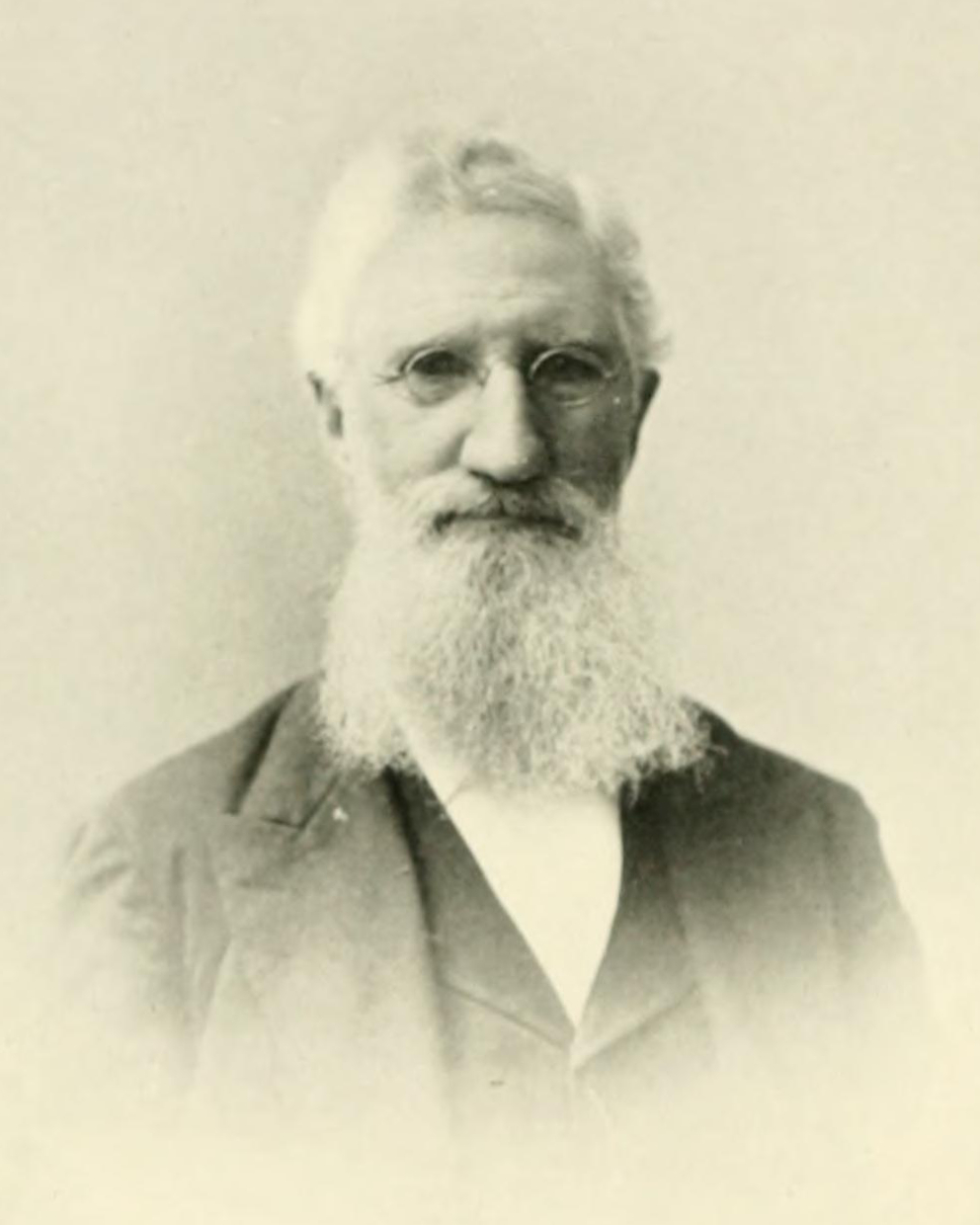
Photo of James E. A. Gibbs, taken some time prior to 1902

James Edward Allen Gibbs (1829–1902) was a farmer, inventor, and businessman from Rockbridge County in the Shenandoah Valley in Virginia. On June 2, 1857, he was awarded a patent for the first twisted chain-stitch single-thread sewing machine using a rotating hook. In partnership with James Willcox, Gibbs became a principal in the Willcox & Gibbs Sewing Machine Company.

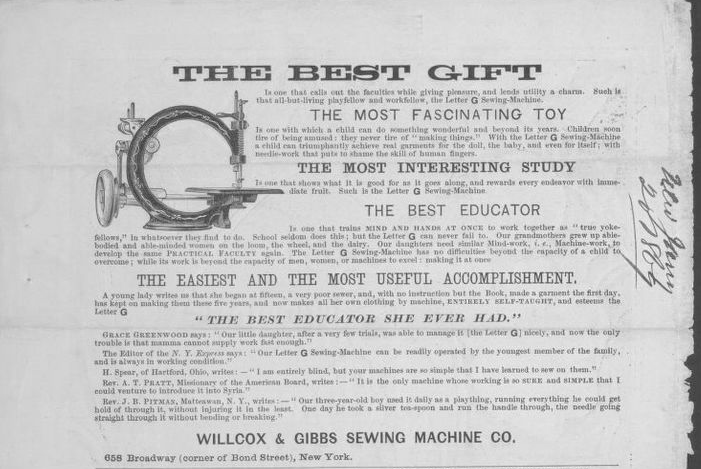
Advertisement of Willcox & Gibbs Sewing Machine Letter G, 1869, from LOC

The Willcox & Gibbs Sewing Machine Company started in 1857 by James E. A. Gibbs and James Willcox opened its London Office in 1859 at 135 Regent Street. By around 1871 the European offices were at 150 Cheapside, London and later 20 Fore Street, London. The company hired John Emory Powers for marketing its product. Powers pioneered the use of many new marketing techniques, including full-page ads in the form of a story or play, free trial uses of a product and installment purchasing plan. The marketing campaign created a demand for sewing machines in Great Britain that Willcox and Gibbs could not meet. The machine's circular design was so popular that it was produced well into the early 20th century, long after most machines were of the more conventional design. The machines shown employ the Gibbs rotary twisted chain stitch mechanism which was less prone to coming undone.

Following his successful invention, he named his family's farm "Raphine." The name originated from an old Greek word "raphis" which means "to sew." The community of Raphine, Virginia, was named in his honor.

== Gallery ==
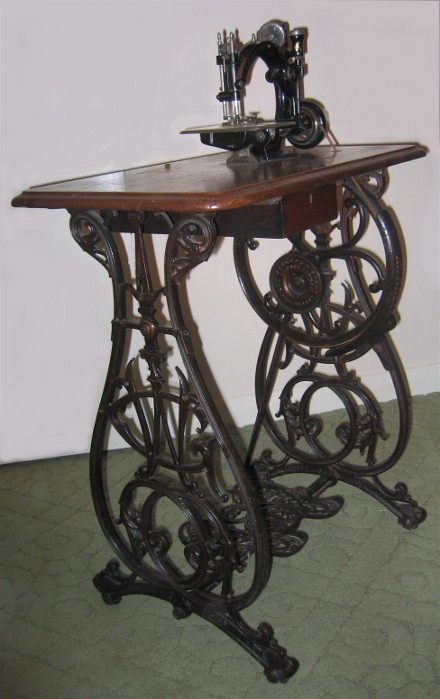
A Willcox and Gibbs sewing machine on its ornate treadle.

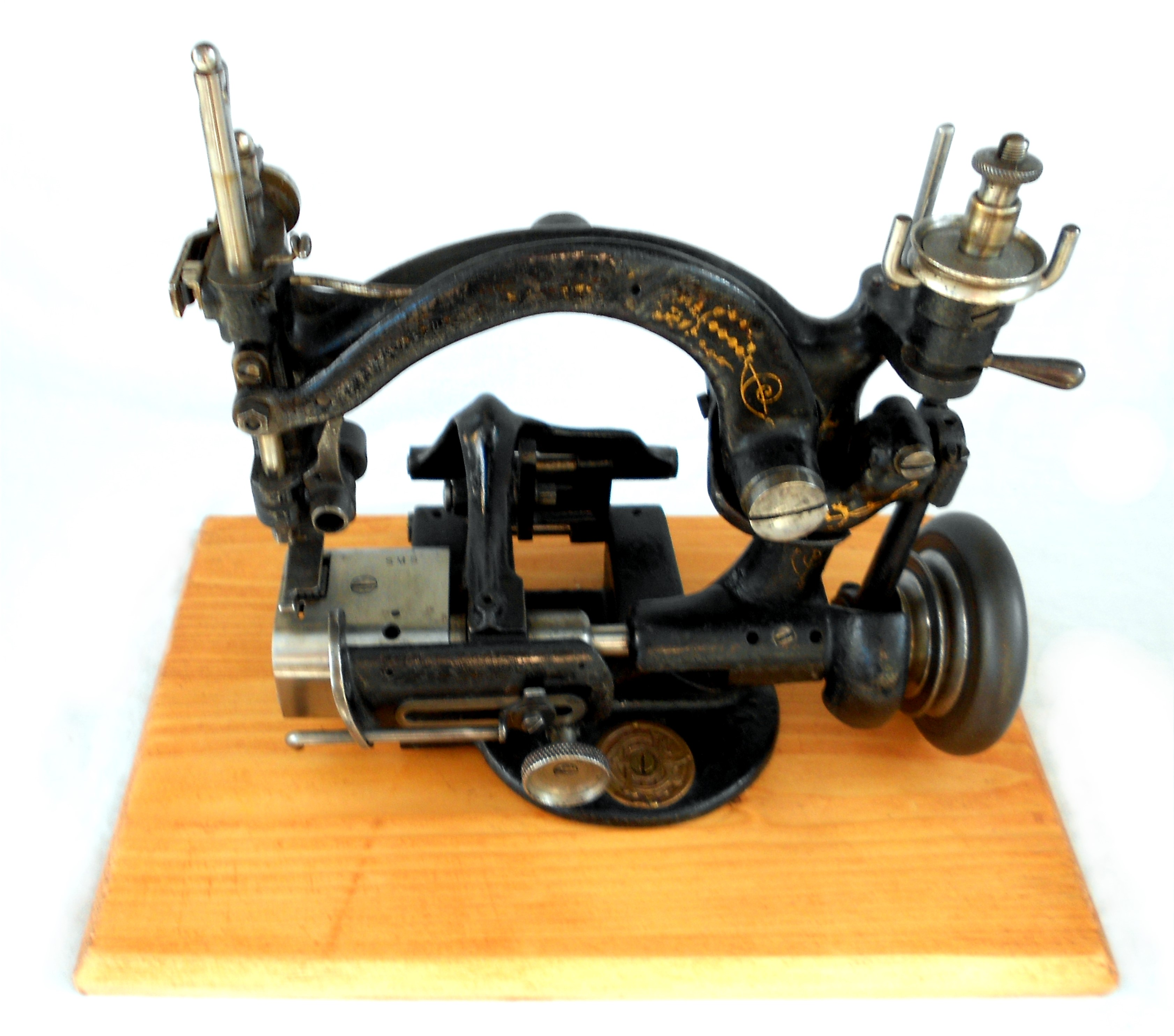
A German straw hat machine from Heinrich Grossmann built around a Willcox and Gibbs.
