= Hays Creek Mill =

- U.S. National Register of Historic Places
- Virginia Landmarks Register
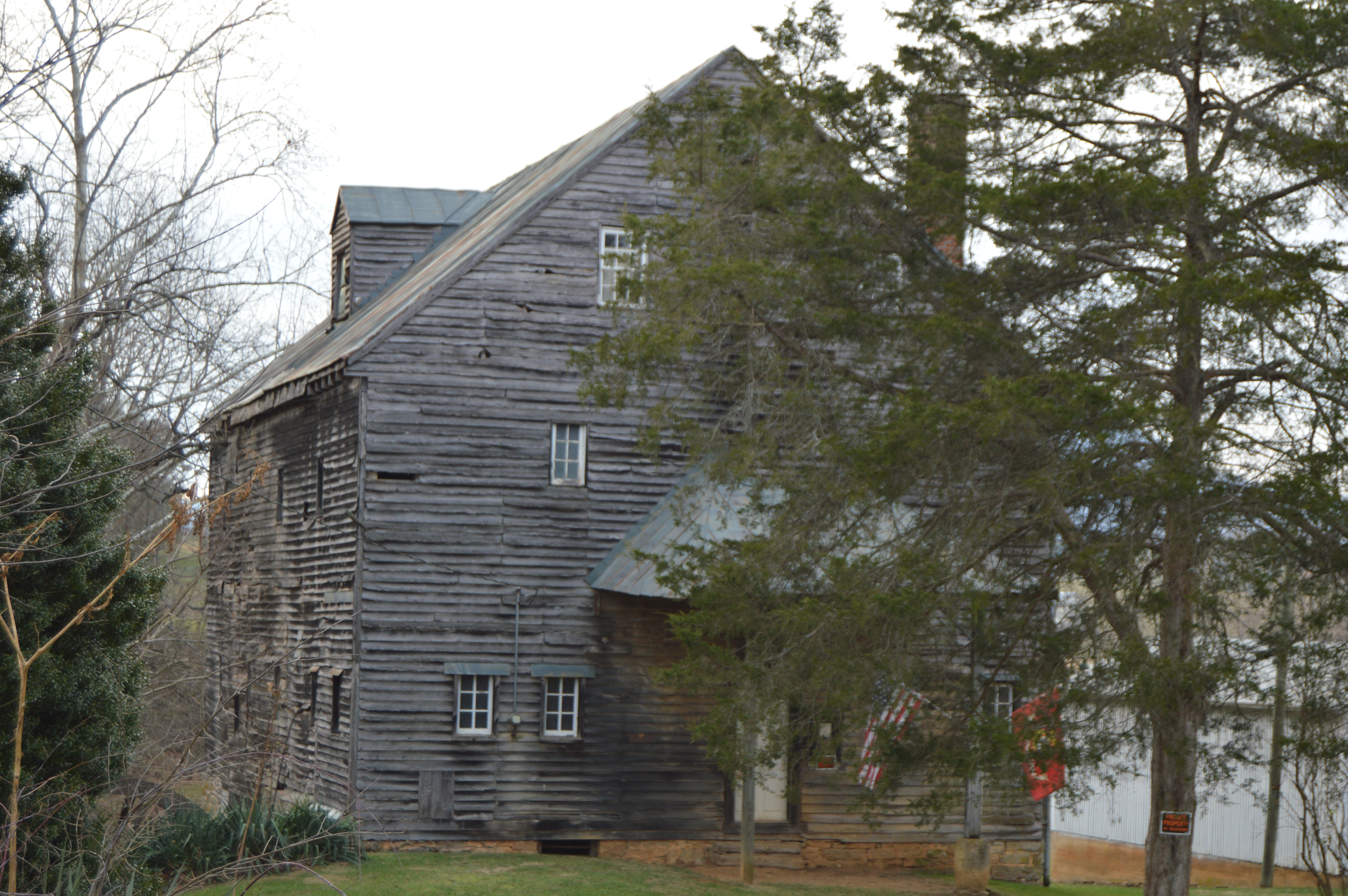
- Front and southeastern side

- Location within Virginia Location within the United States
- Location: VA 724, 0.1 mi. N of jct. with VA 726, near Brownsburg, Virginia
- Coordinates: 37°56′8″N 79°20′38″W
- Area: 4.3 acres (1.7 ha)
- Built: c. 1819
- Architectural style: Federal
- NRHP reference No.: 95000973
- VLR No.: 081-0159

Significant dates
- Added to NRHP: August 4, 1995
- Designated VLR: June 27, 1995

Hays Creek Mill, also known as McClung's Mill, Patterson's Mill, and Steele's Mill, is a historic grist mill located near Brownsburg, Rockbridge County, Virginia. It dates to about 1819, and is a 2 1/2-story, rectangular wood-frame building on a limestone basement. The building measures 35 feet by 45 feet and retains an iron overshot wheel measuring 15 feet in diameter and 5 feet thick. Associated with the mill are the contributing miller's house, garage that once served as a corn crib, and cow barn. The Hays Creek Mill remained in operation until 1957 in a number of capacities as a grist, saw, and fulling mill.

It was listed on the National Register of Historic Places in 1995.
