= Marlbrook, Shropshire =

Hamlet in Shropshire, England

Coordinates: 52.331°N 2.498°W

Marlbrook
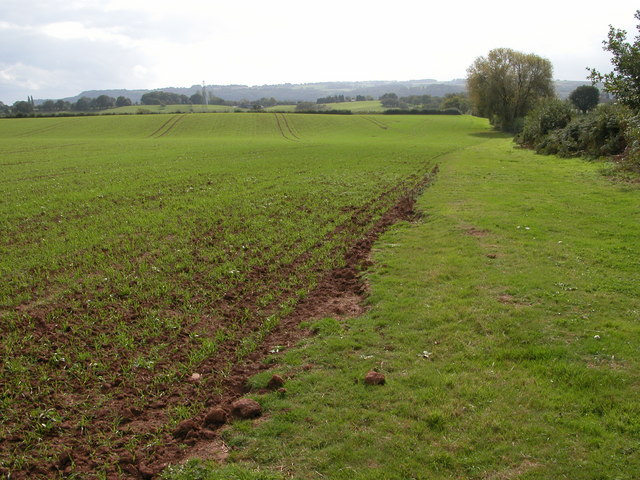
- Farmland to the northeast of Marlbrook

- Location within Shropshire
- OS grid reference: SO660704
- Civil parish: Neen Sollars
- Unitary authority: Shropshire
- Ceremonial county: Shropshire
- Region: West Midlands
- Country: England
- Sovereign state: United Kingdom
- Post town: TENBURY WELLS
- Postcode district: WR15
- Dialling code: 01584
- Police: West Mercia
- Fire: Shropshire
- Ambulance: West Midlands
- UK Parliament: Ludlow

Marlbrook is a hamlet in Shropshire, England, right on the border with Worcestershire.
