= Brownsburg Historic District =

Historic district in Virginia, United States

- U.S. National Register of Historic Places
- U.S. Historic district
- Virginia Landmarks Register
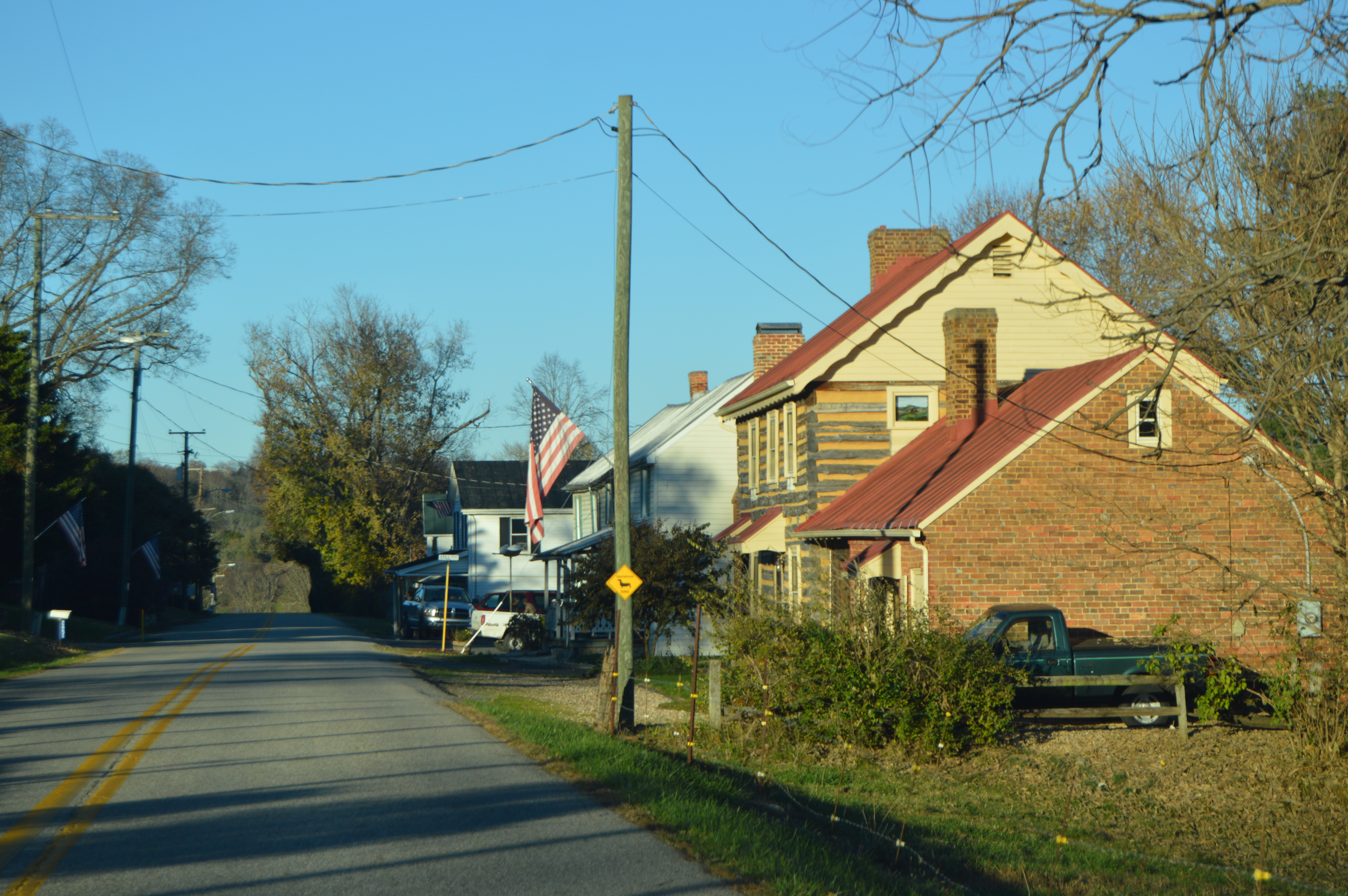
- Entering the community from the south

- Location within Virginia Location within the United States
- Location: Including the entire village extending 0.5 miles along State Route 252, Brownsburg, Virginia
- Coordinates: 37°55′43″N 79°19′09″W
- Area: 100 acres (40 ha)
- Built: 1825
- Architectural style: Federal, Valley Federal
- NRHP reference No.: 73002055
- VLR No.: 081-0121

Significant dates
- Added to NRHP: July 2, 1973
- Designated VLR: February 20, 1973

Brownsburg Historic District is a national historic district located at Brownsburg, Rockbridge County, Virginia. The district encompasses 42 contributing buildings in the town of Brownsburg. Established in 1783 on the lands of Robert Wardlaw and Samuel McChesney, the town became a major hub of activity by 1835, before losing commercial importance around the turn of the century, due to the arrival of a nearby rail line. It includes a variety of residential, commercial, and institutional buildings most of which date from one of two periods - the first half of the 19th century and the period 1870–1910. Notable buildings include the Swope House, Wade brick house, Bosworth log house, Newcomer house, Coblentz house and store, NYE Pool Hall, Wade frame house, Ward House, and the Fixx House.

It was listed on the National Register of Historic Places in 1973.
