= Mulberry Grove (Brownsburg, Virginia) =

Historic house in Virginia, United States

- U.S. National Register of Historic Places
- Virginia Landmarks Register
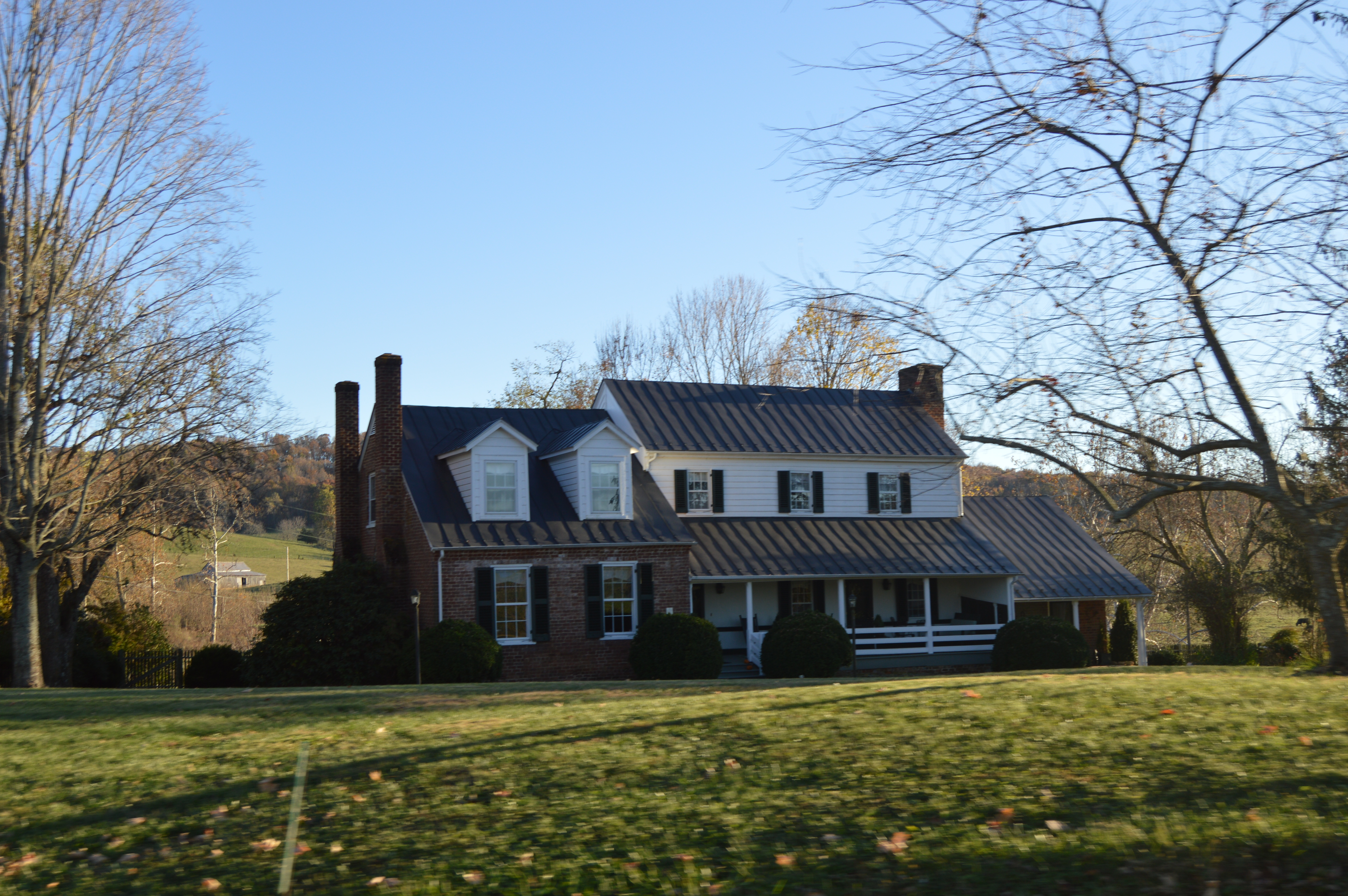
- Front of the house

- Location within Virginia Location within the United States
- Location: Southern side of Sterrett Road, 5000 feet southeast of its junction with State Route 252 at Brownsburg, Virginia
- Coordinates: 37°55′24″N 79°18′22″W
- Area: 2.5 acres (1.0 ha)
- Built: c. 1790
- Architectural style: Federal, Vernacular Federal
- NRHP reference No.: 94000761
- VLR No.: 081-0044

Significant dates
- Added to NRHP: July 28, 1994
- Designated VLR: April 20, 1994

Mulberry Grove is a historic home located near Brownsburg, Rockbridge County, Virginia. The original section was built about 1790, and later expanded in the 1820s to a two-story, three-bay, brick and frame Federal style dwelling. It has a side gable roof and two chimneys at the northeast end and one brick chimney near the southwest end. A frame stair hall was added about 1828 and brick wings were added at each end about 1840. The property includes a contributing log meat house and a double-pen log barn. The house was built for William Houston, a relative of the Texas pioneer and Rockbridge County native, Sam Houston.

It was listed on the National Register of Historic Places in 1994.
