= Raphine, Virginia =

Raphine
- Unincorporated community
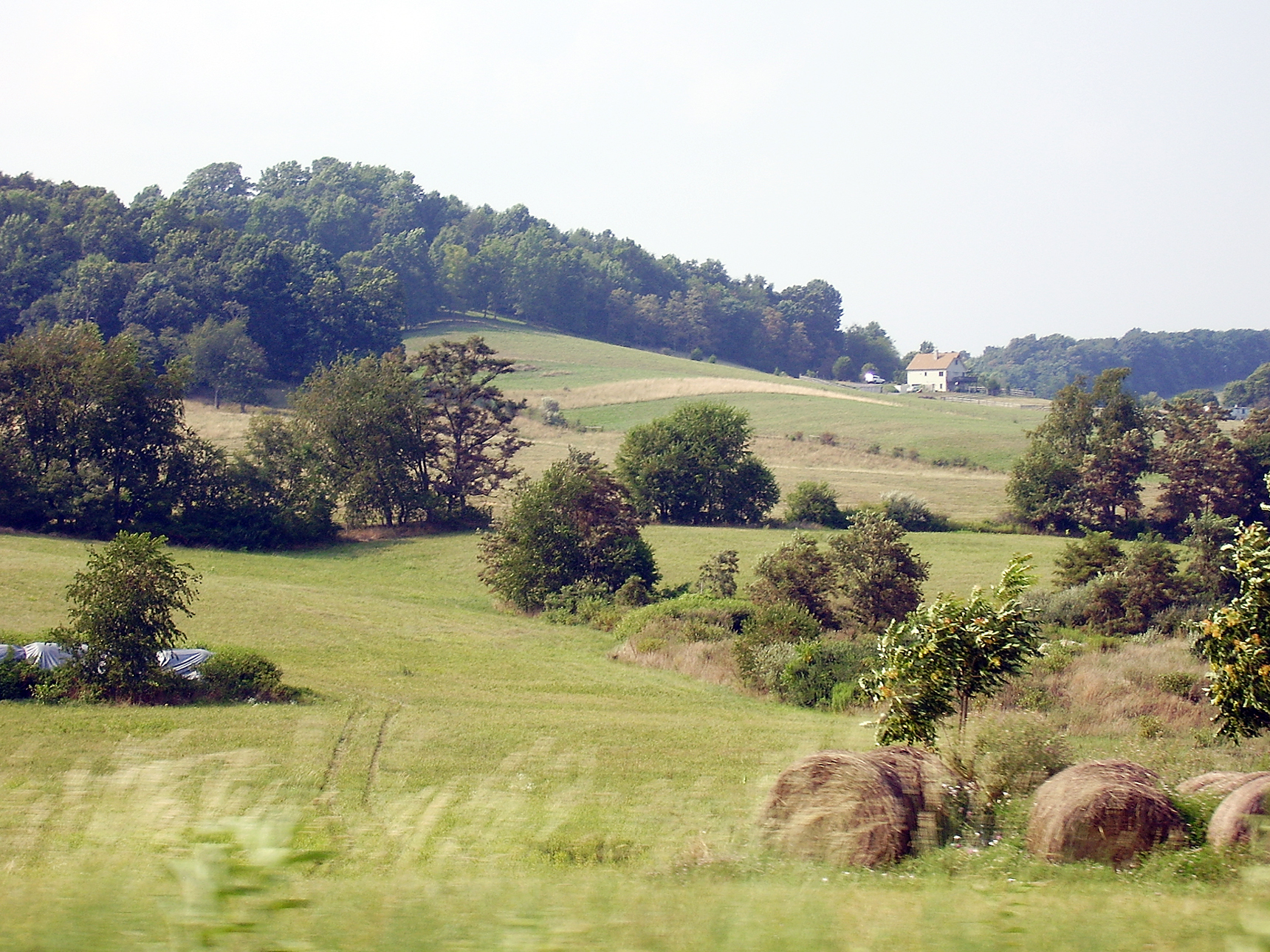
- A picturesque scene in Raphine, Virginia

- Location within the state of Virginia Raphine (the United States)
- Coordinates: 37°56′14″N 79°13′58″W
- Country: United States
- State: Virginia
- County: Rockbridge
- Elevation: 1,503 ft (458 m)
- Time zone: UTC−5 (Eastern (EST))
  - Summer (DST): UTC−4 (EDT)
- ZIP code: 24472
- Area code: 540

Raphine is an unincorporated community in Rockbridge County in the Shenandoah Valley in the U.S. state of Virginia.

== History ==
The name "Raphine" was chosen in honor of James Edward Allen Gibbs (1829-1902), a local farmer who patented a novel single-thread chain-stitch sewing machine on June 2, 1857. Gibbs had named his home in the area ("Raphine Hall"), and the new railroad station ("Raphine"), after the ancient Greek word "rhaphis", meaning "needle". In partnership with James Willcox, Gibbs formed the Willcox & Gibbs Sewing Machine Company. Willcox & Gibbs commercial sewing machines are still made and used in the 21st century.

Nearby, the McCormick plantationWalnut Grove, was the home of Cyrus McCormick (1809-1884)'s family, including parents and brothers. His father owned more than 500 acres.

McCormick became famous as the inventor of the mechanical reaper in 1831. He moved to Chicago, Illinois in 1847, and was the founder, with his brother Leander, of the McCormick Harvesting Machine Company. It became part of International Harvester Corporation in 1902. Donated to the state of Virginia in the 1960s, the McCormick property was used as a test farm for Virginia Polytechnic Institute and State University (better known as "Virginia Tech").

Surviving as important structures of their historic period, Walnut Grove, the Kennedy-Lunsford Farm, and Kennedy-Wade Mill are listed on the National Register of Historic Places.

== Publications ==
- The Rockbridge Advocate (monthly magazine)
- The News-Gazette (weekly newspaper)
- Rockbridge Weekly (weekly newspaper)
