= Steeles Tavern, Virginia =

Unincorporated community in Virginia, US

Coordinates: 37°55′32″N 79°12′09″W

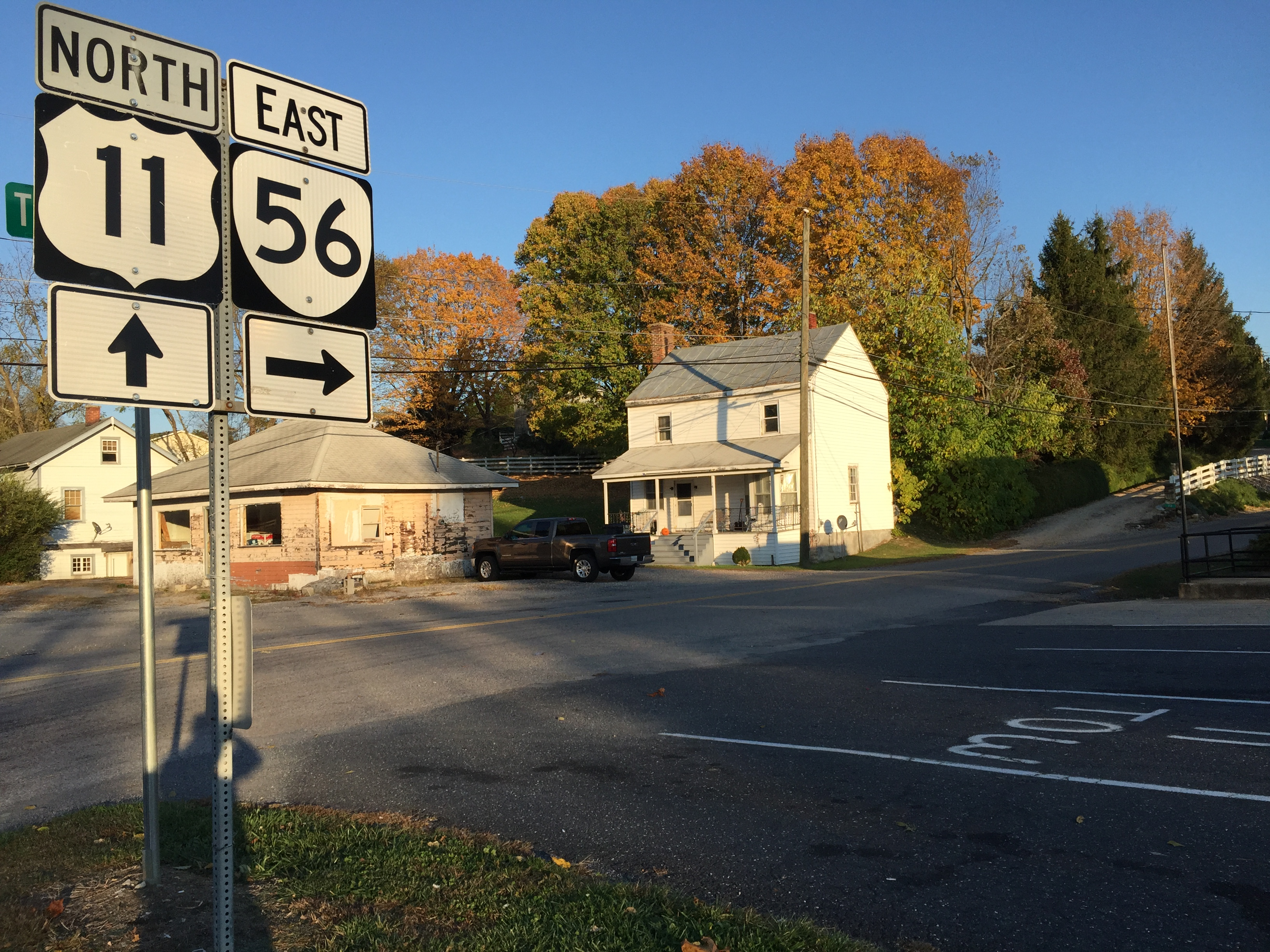
VA State Route 56 at US Route 11 in Steeles Tavern

Steeles Tavern (formerly Midway) is an unincorporated community in Augusta and Rockbridge counties, Virginia, United States. It lies at an elevation of 1683 feet (513 m).

The Cyrus McCormick Farm was listed on the National Register of Historic Places in 1966.
