= William Mackey House (Cornwall, Virginia) =

Historic house in Virginia, United States

- Mulberry Grove
- U.S. National Register of Historic Places
- Virginia Landmarks Register
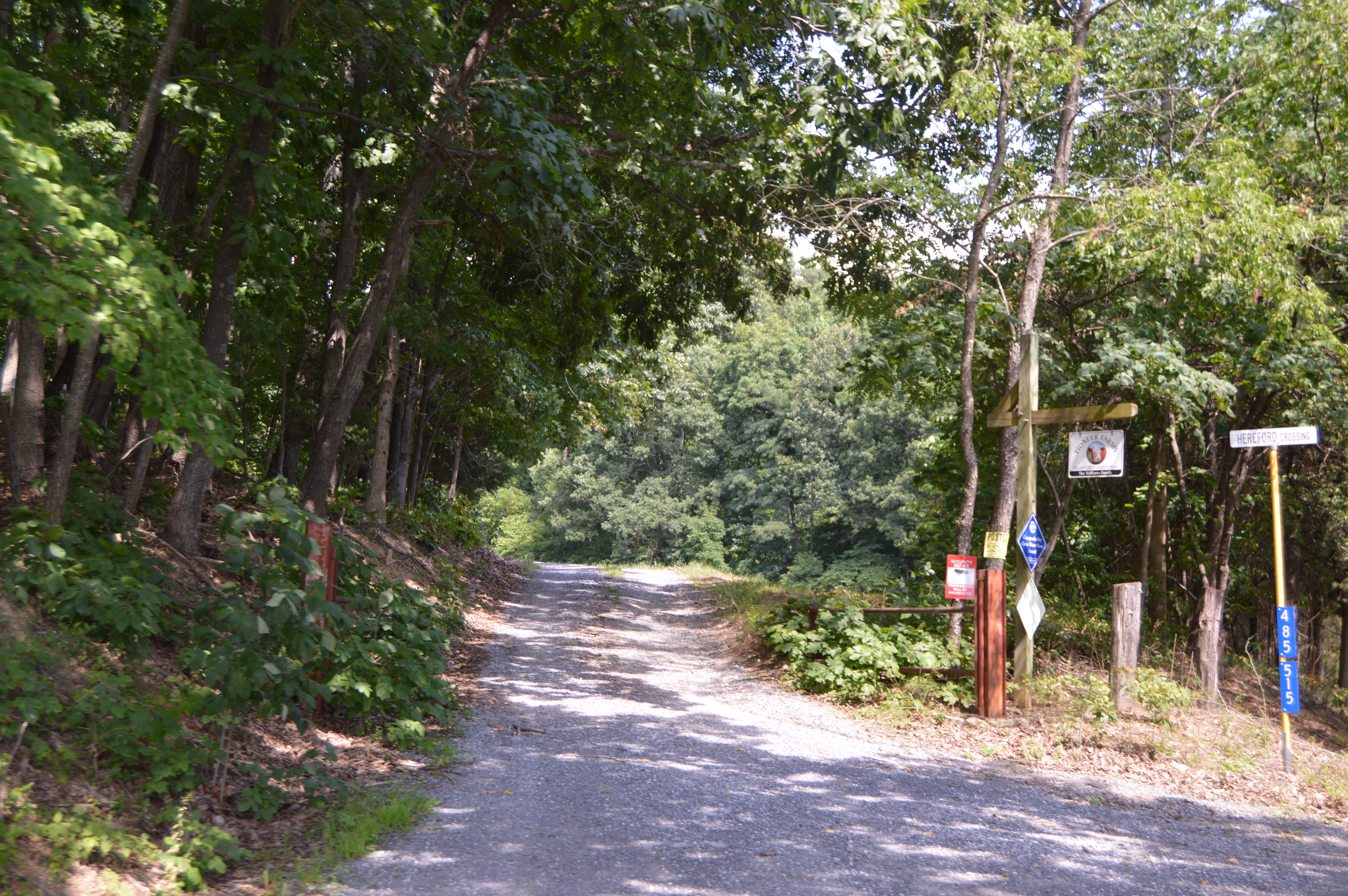
- Driveway to the property

- Location within Virginia Location within the United States
- Location: VA 716, .5 mi SE of jct. with US 11, near Cornwall, Virginia
- Coordinates: 37°50′12″N 79°20′43″W
- Area: 214 acres (87 ha)
- Built: 1796
- Architectural style: Early Republic, I-House
- NRHP reference No.: 93001126
- VLR No.: 081-0039

Significant dates
- Added to NRHP: October 29, 1993
- Designated VLR: August 18, 1993

Mulberry Grove is a historic home located near Cornwall, Rockbridge County, Virginia, USA. It was built in 1796, and is a two-story, three-bay, stone I-house dwelling. It has a side gable roof, exterior end chimneys, and a bold cornice decorated with modillions and dentils. A two-story frame addition and one-story porch were added about 1900. The property includes a contributing bank barn and granary, both erected around 1900.

It was listed on the National Register of Historic Places in 1994.
