= Marlbrook (house) =

Historic house in Virginia, United States

- U.S. National Register of Historic Places
- Virginia Landmarks Register
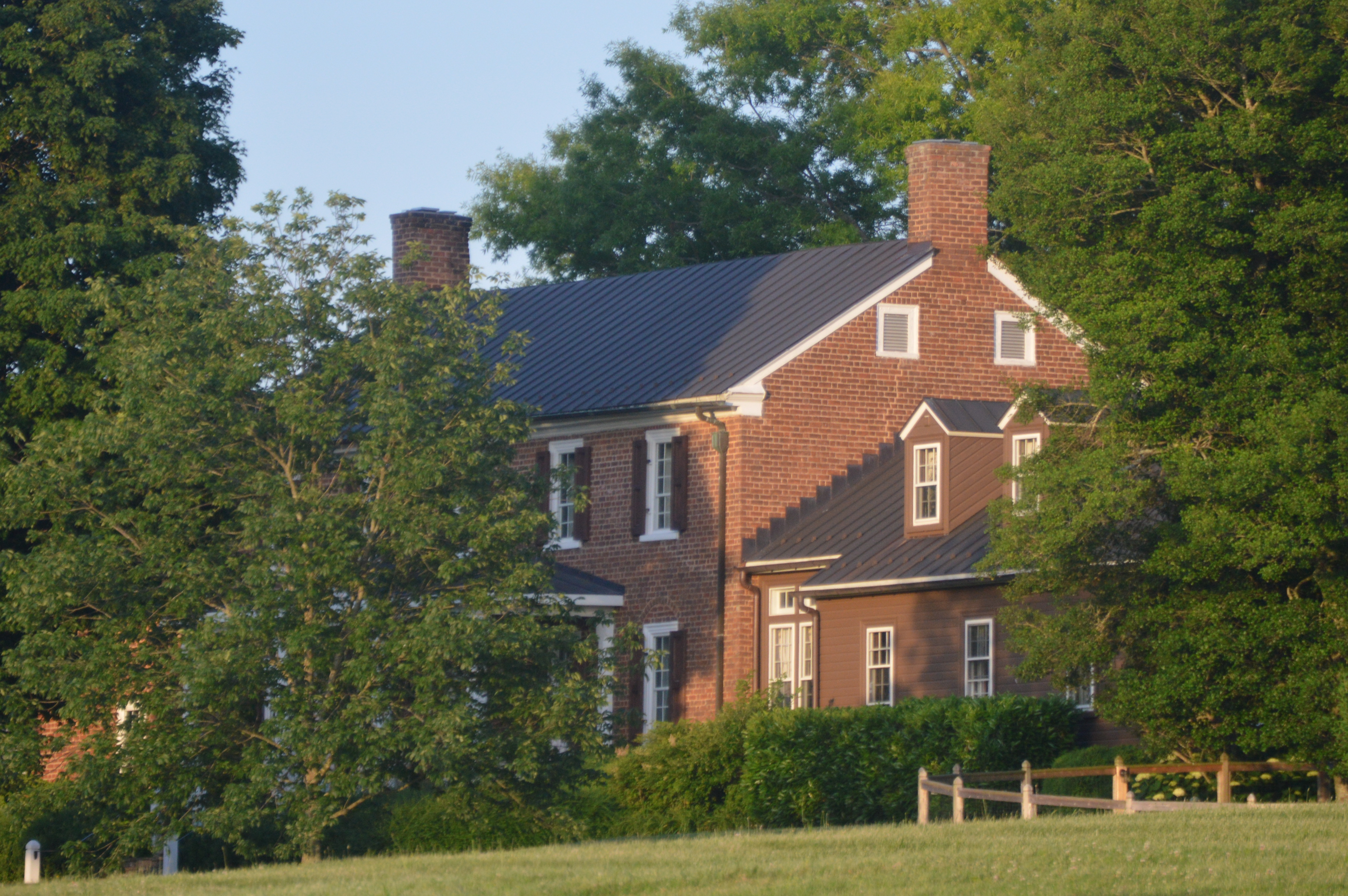
- Front and western side

- Location within Virginia Location within the United States
- Location: 4973 Forge Rd., near Glasgow, Virginia
- Coordinates: 37°39′06″N 79°29′55″W
- Area: 123.3 acres (49.9 ha)
- Built: 1795
- Architectural style: Georgian
- NRHP reference No.: 02001000
- VLR No.: 081-0009

Significant dates
- Added to NRHP: September 14, 2002
- Designated VLR: June 12, 2002

Marlbrook, also known as Cherry Hill, is a historic home located near Glasgow, Rockbridge County, Virginia. The oldest section dates to about 1766, and is a two-story, five-bay Late Georgian style brick farmhouse with a 1 1/2-story brick east wing and a balancing frame west wing. The east wing was added in 1804 and the west wing in the 1990s. The property also includes the contributing log spring house, cistern (1870s), barn, tenant house (1945), and garage / workshop (1945).

It was listed on the National Register of Historic Places in 2002.
