= Kennedy-Wade Mill =

- U.S. National Register of Historic Places
- U.S. Historic district
- Virginia Landmarks Register
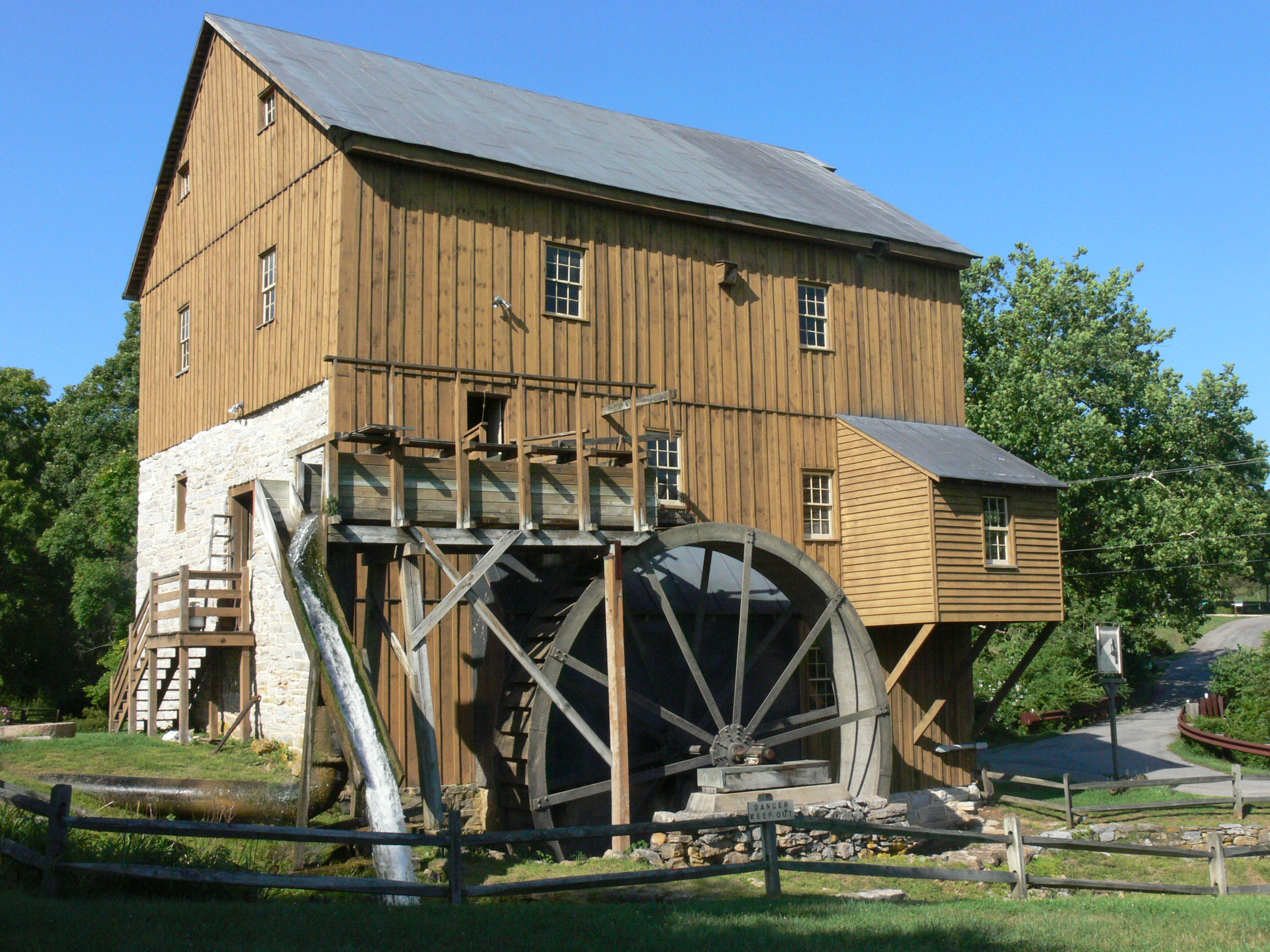
- Wade's Mill, July 2012

- Location within Virginia Location within the United States
- Location: VA 606 (Raphine Rd.), 2000 ft. NE of jct. with VA 721, Raphine, Virginia
- Coordinates: 37°57′1″N 79°17′11″W
- Area: 113 acres (46 ha)
- Built: 1793
- Architect: Andrew Kennedy
- Architectural style: Grist Mill, Federal, I-house
- NRHP reference No.: 79003296, 94000458
- VLR No.: 081-0033-0001

Significant dates
- Added to NRHP: July 13, 1979; May 26, 1994 (Boundary Increase)
- Designated VLR: May 16, 1978; March 10, 1994

The Kennedy-Wade Mill, or Wade's Mill, is a grist mill and national historic district located in Raphine, Virginia and listed on the National Register of Historic Places. It was originally built c. 1750 by Captain Joseph Kennedy. In 1846 the mill was sold by the Kennedy family to Henry B. Jones, who expanded and improved the mill. After passing to other owners in 1867, the mill was damaged by fire in 1873. It was rebuilt and leased to (and later bought by) James F. Wade, and put back into use in November 1882.

The Wade family continued to operate it for four generations. It was bought in 1991 by Jim Young, who restored the exterior and operated it for 25 years until selling to John and Karen Siegfried in July 2016. The mill was bought by April Anderson in February 2024, and is still functioning today as a mill, store, event venue, and vacation rental. The mill grinds flour using millstones and a 21-foot overshot water wheel. The flour is shipped to restaurants and livestock farmers.

Nearby and also part of the Kennedy-Wade's Mill Historic District are the miller's house and other houses and outbuildings structures forming the small mill community.
