= James Byrne =

James or Jim Byrne may refer to:

== Politics ==
- James A. Byrne (1906–1980), U.S. representative from Pennsylvania
- James Allen Byrne (1911–1975), Liberal Party member of the Canadian House of Commons
- James J. Byrne (politician) (1863–1930), American singer and politician from New York

== Religion ==
- James Byrne (bishop of Toowoomba) (1870–1938), Irish-born priest
- James Byrne (archbishop of Dubuque) (1908–1996), Roman Catholic prelate who served as archbishop of Dubuque and bishop of Boise
- James Byrne (dean of Clonfert) (1820–1897), Church of Ireland priest

== Sports ==
- James Byrne (footballer) (born 1978), Australian rules footballer
- James Byrne (sailor) (born 1948), Australian Olympic sailor
- J. F. Byrne (1871–1954), English cricketer; captain of Warwickshire and rugby international
- Jim Byrne (footballer, born 1880) (1880–1927), Australian rules footballer for Melbourne
- Jim Byrne (footballer, born 1933), Australian rules footballer for St Kilda
- Jim Byrne (Gaelic footballer) (1890–?), Irish Gaelic football administrator, referee and player
- Jim Byrne (dual player) (born 1973), hurling and Gaelic football coach and former player of both sports
- Jimmy Byrne (born 1941), Irish hurler

== Other ==
- James Byrne (Irish criminal) (1947/1948–2024), Irish criminal
- James Byrne (lawyer) (born 1964), American lawyer
- James Byrne (musician) (1946–2008), Irish traditional musician
- James Byrne (poet) (born 1977), British poet and editor
- James Byrne (VC) (1822–1872), Irish recipient of the Victoria Cross
- James J. Byrne (US Civil War officer) (1841–1880), Irish-American Union Army officer and United States Marshal
- James Byrne (fl. 1775–1819) of Clone, County Wexford, see List of monumental masons

== See also ==
- James Burns (disambiguation)
- James Byrnes (disambiguation)
