= James Burns =

James Burns may refer to:

== Business ==
- James Burns (Australian shipowner) (1846–1923), Australian businessman
- James W. Burns (1921–2019), Canadian businessman
- James Burns (merchant), Glasgow-born merchant of the 17th century
- James Burns (publisher) (1808–1871), Scottish publisher and author
- James Burns (Scottish shipowner) (1789–1871)
- James D. Burns (1865–1928), American businessman and owner of the Detroit Tigers
- James Ormston Burns (1925–1998), founder of Burns London, a guitar and amplifier company

== Entertainment ==
- James MacGregor Burns (1918–2014), American biographer
- Jim Burns (born 1948), Welsh artist
- Jim Burns (poet) (born 1936), English poet
- Jim Burns (television producer) (1952–2017), American television producer and writer
- Jim Burns (Oz), character on the HBO series Oz
- Jimmy Burns (born 1943), American blues guitarist, singer and songwriter

== Religion ==
- James Burns (Spiritualist) (1835–1894), Scottish journalist and publisher
- James A. Burns (1867–1940), American priest and president of the University of Notre Dame
- James Anderson Burns (1865–1945), founder of the Oneida Baptist Institute
- James Chalmers Burns (1809–1892), Scottish minister
- James Drummond Burns (1823–1864), Scottish Presbyterian minister and poet

== Sports ==
- James Burns (cricketer) (1866–1957), English cricketer
- Farmer Burns (baseball) (James Joseph Burns, 1876–?), American baseball player
- Jamie Burns (born 1984), English footballer
- Jim Burns (baseball) (died 1909), 19th-century baseball player
- Jim Burns (basketball) (1945–2020), American basketball player, lawyer, and politician
- Jim Burns (footballer) (1943–2025), Scottish footballer
- Jim Burns (rugby union), Welsh international rugby union player

== Other ==
- James Burns, 3rd Baron Inverclyde (1864–1919)
- James Glencairn Burns, son of poet Robert Burns
- J. H. Burns (James Henderson Burns, 1921–2012), Scottish historian
- J. Irving Burns (1843–1925), American lawyer and politician
- James M. Burns (judge) (1924–2001), U.S. federal judge
- James M. Burns (soldier) (1845–1910), Union Army soldier and officer during the American Civil War
- James Richard Henry Burns (1916–2002), English police officer who became a nobleman in Brunei

== See also ==
- James Burn (1849–?), Australian cricketer
- James Burnes (disambiguation)
- James Byrnes (disambiguation)
- James Byrne (disambiguation)
