= William T. Poague =

Confederate Army officer in the American Civil War

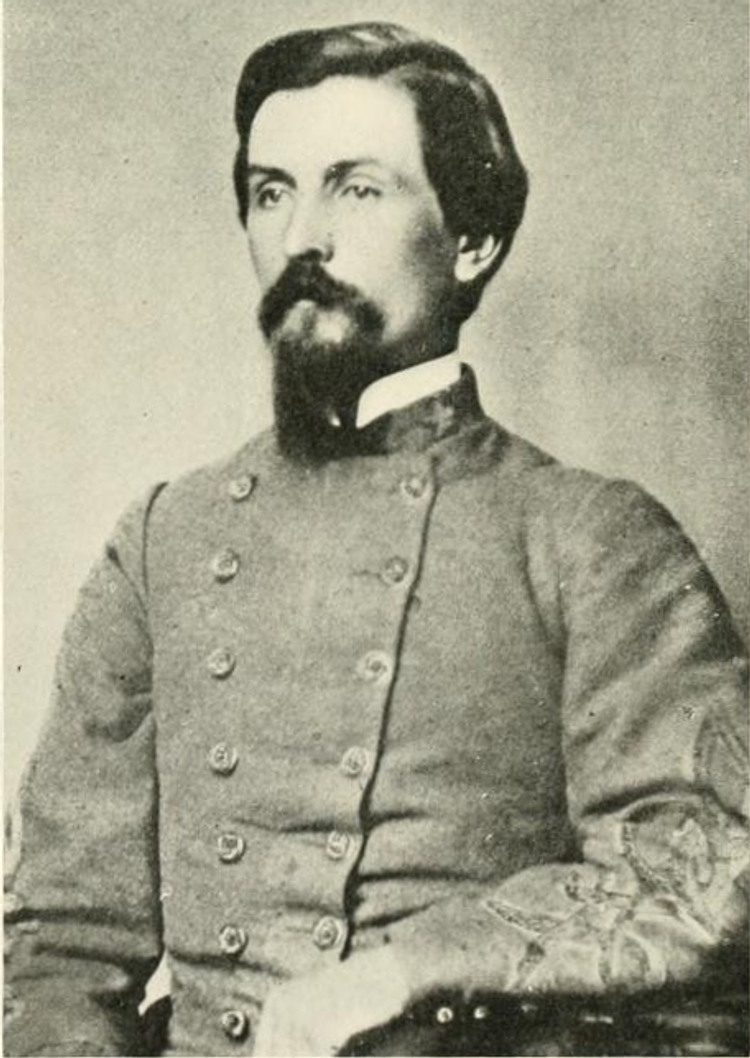
- Born: December 20, 1835; Rockbridge County, Virginia, US
- Died: September 8, 1914 (aged 78); Lexington, Virginia, US
- Burial place: Oak Grove Cemetery; Lexington, Virginia
- Military career
- Allegiance: Confederate States of America
- Branch: Confederate States Army artillery
- Service years: 1861–1865
- Rank: Colonel
- Conflicts: In the American Civil War: First Manassas; Romney Expedition; 1862 Valley Campaign; Peninsula Campaign; Northern Virginia Campaign; Maryland Campaign; Battle of Fredericksburg; Battle of Chancellorsville; Battle of Gettysburg; Battle of Mine Run; Battle of Bristoe Station; Overland Campaign; Siege of Petersburg; Appomattox Campaign
- Other work: Farmer; Teacher; Politician; Treasurer of Virginia Military Institute

William Thomas Poague (December 20, 1835 – September 8, 1914) was a Confederate States Army officer serving in the artillery during the American Civil War. He later served as Treasurer of the Virginia Military Institute.

== Early life ==
Born in Rockbridge County, Virginia, to John Barclay and Elizabeth Stuart Paxton Poague, Poague attended and graduated from Washington College where he was a member of the Virginia Beta chapter of Phi Kappa Psi. Poague was practicing law in St. Joseph, Missouri when the Civil War began.

== Civil War ==
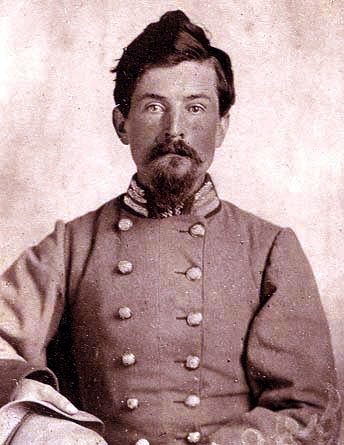
William T. Poague

Poague returned to Virginia and entered the Confederate Army as a second lieutenant in the famous Rockbridge Virginia Artillery. Poague was promoted to captain of the unit by April 1862. With the battery, Poague fought at the battles of First Manassas, Romney, Kernstown, McDowell, and later with the Army of Northern Virginia in the Seven Days Battles and at Cedar Mountain, Second Manassas, the Harper's Ferry, Antietam, and Fredericksburg.

On June 9, 1862, at the Battle of Port Republic, Poague and the Rockbridge Artillery helped prevent the capture of Maj. Gen. Thomas J. "Stonewall" Jackson as he fled U.S. soldiers pouring into the town. The unit deployed its guns, drove the Union troops out, and then later assisted in their pursuit.

On September 17, 1862, the 1st Rockbridge Artillery commanded by Poague was positioned near the Dunkard Church where it endured a severe counter-battery cross fire during the Battle of Antietam. One 6-pounder howitzer had been detached to Williamsport with the Reserve Artillery, leaving the battery 2 10-pounder Parrott rifles and 1 Napoleon. One officer and five enlisted men were wounded and 14 horses were killed. The loss of almost all of the horses of two of the pieces forced them to be withdrawn to the rear as unserviceable. The battery’s lone remaining piece was sent with several other guns to the far left flank to assist General Stuart in driving back Federal batteries but after fifteen minutes the effort was abandoned.

On December 13, 1862, Colonel J. Thompson Brown’s reserve artillery were stationed along Mine Run near Hamilton’s house during the morning of the Battle of Fredericksburg. Jackson’s artillery chief, Colonel Stapleton Crutchfield, ordered Brown to send relief to Walker on Prospect Hill. Captain William Thomas Poague’s battery placed a section of 20-pound Parrott Rifles. One of Poague’s gunners wrote about arriving up on Prospect Hill. “The ground, when [the battery] arrived, was already strewn with dead horses and wrecked batteries…” Other replacements included a section from the King William artillery under Captain William Page Carter. Captain Poague describes the area along the road as ‘Dead Horse Hill’. Whether or not Walker’s gunners kept the teams doctrinally positioned or not, there were approximately 200 horses associated with Walker’s 14 guns on the hill in the morning. Additionally, those replacement batteries, like Poague’s, were under Union artillery fire later on the day of battle. ‘Dead Horse Hill’ was an apt term resulting from Union artillery barrages. Captain William Thomas Poague gives us the following account of his action early that afternoon:

"Colonel Brown was ordered to relieve Lindsay Walker’s Battalion which had been badly smashed up on what was afterwards known as Dead Horse Hill. My guns (two 20-pound Parrot rifles) were at the head of the column and with me was riding Dr. Hayslett. As we began the ascent of the hill there came tearing down through the woods towards us a horseman bareheaded with handkerchief around his forehead, a short pipe in his mouth and suddenly reining up, called out ‘where are you all going?’ and as I told him ‘to take the place of Walker’s Battalion’ he fairly shouted, ‘good for you; we need you! We’re knocked all to pieces! Isn’t this fun!’ As he turned his horse and galloped back, Hayslett broke out with one of his noted big laughs, ‘Well, that fellow must be crazy, don’t you think?’ I replied: ‘He’s all right, that’s Ham Chamberlayne.’” Lieutenant J. Hampden Chamberlayne was the aid to Walker.

Crutchfield’s reported, “Fifteen guns-composed of sections from the batteries of Captain Poague [Lieutenant A. Graham, commanding] Watson, Smith, Garber, one gun of Captain Dance’s battery, and the Louisiana Guards Battery [three guns]-were thrown into position into the plain to our right, so as to cross their fire with that of the guns of Lieutenant-Colonel Walker, being specially designed to check the advance of the enemy toward the road from Hamilton’s Crossing to the river road. These pieces were under the immediate command of Major [John] Pelham, …. All these batteries did not go in at once but were added as the weight of the enemy’s fire seemed to require it.”

Most of this reinforcing artillery, sent by Crutchfield, came from 2nd Corps Artillery Reserve commanded by Colonel J. Thomas Brown. Brown provides additional clarification:

“About 11 o’clock, Saturday morning, my batteries were ordered to a position in rear of Hamilton’s house, ready to be called on as occasion might require. About 12 o’clock, by order Colonel [S.] Crutchfield, I sent two (10-pound) Parrott rifles from Captain Poague’s (1st Rockbridge) battery, under command of Lieutenant [Archibald] Graham, and two similar pieces from the Third Howitzers, under Lieutenant [James S.] Utz, to report to Major [John] Pelham, on the right of the railroad. Shortly afterward I was ordered to send to the same point four other rifle guns, viz, two 10-pounders Parrott’s and one brass rifle from Second Howitzers, and one 3-inch rifle from Captain Dance’s battery, all under the command of Captain Watson, Second Howitzers. These eight guns were actively engaged and suffered severely from the enemy’s artillery and sharpshooters.” Brown continued, "About 2 o’clock, by order of Colonel Crutchfield, I placed in position on the hill to the extreme right of our infantry line the two 20-pounder Parrotts of Captain Poague’s battery. These two pieces unaided engaged the enemy’s artillery and afterward opened upon the infantry. The exact range of the hill having been obtained by much previous firing, our loss at this point was heavy. … Later in the evening, Lieutenant-Colonel [L. M.] Coleman brought up two howitzers from Captain Dance’s battery and placed them on the left of Captain Poague’s pieces. … Late in the evening two pieces of Captain Hupp’s battery, under Lieutenant [Charles B.] Griffin, were ordered to the right of the railroad.”

Poague was promoted to Major on March 2, 1863. He served as an executive officer to David G. McIntosh at the Battle of Chancellorsville. The battery fired 820 rounds in support of Confederate general Jubal Early's lines near Fredericksburg and suffered few casualties. Poague was later given his own battalion upon the formation of the Third Corps.

Poague commanded the battalion at Gettysburg, Bristoe Station, Mine Run, the Wilderness, Spotsylvania, North Anna, and Cold Harbor.

Poague's greatest service to the Confederacy probably occurred at the Wilderness with the command of his own battalion, facing an entire corps of the advancing enemy with 12 guns to oppose them. The young Colonel was able to hold off Winfield S. Hancock's II Corps on the morning of the second day, firing over the heads of wounded Confederates, long enough for Lt. Gen. James Longstreet to arrive and "save the day". Lt. Gen. A.P. Hill turned to Poague, firing double charges, because things were so desperate that it could not be even delayed to allow wounded Confederates to get out of the way. Hill himself helped man Poague's guns. Colonel Poague and General Robert E. Lee stood their ground as the guns of the battalion continued pouring grape into the ranks of the oncoming infantry. In the midst of the action, Lee rode forward with the Texas Brigade. “This was the first time General Lee ever advanced in a charge with his troops,” noted Poague in measured language, “and his action shows how critical the condition was at that juncture. I have often been asked about the appearance of General Lee at the time. He was perfectly composed, but his face expressed a kind of grim determination…. I suppose the scene was very similar to that of May 12 near the Bloody Angle.”

Clifford Dowdey described in his book, Lee's Last Campaign, how

Before Longstreet's first regiment neared the field, the advancing [Union] troops along the road had been checked at the clearing of the Tapp farm. The men who checked the advance...were Colonel William Poague and the cannoneers." Dowdey continued, "Poague's men stood to their guns without infantry support and without line of retreat, with cannoneers dropping from rifle fire, as if serving pieces in a fort...No legend should obscure the performance of young Poague and the scant three hundred men serving the guns. For, so steady was their work that Lee took them for granted, a finger in the dike, as he cast about behind his breaking lines for help to hold back the tide.

Jennings Cropper Wise, a historian for General Lee and his artillery, wrote that "Poague's single battalion of artillery...stood alone like a wall of flame across the enemy's path. The great commander (Lee) knew then full well that between him and disaster Poague's battalion stood alone. What glory for a soldier! This single incident brought more of honor to the little colonel of artillery than most soldiers attain in a lifetime." Poague says very little of his own heroic action at the Wilderness, focusing the attention instead upon his faithful men and his adored commander.

In a letter to his mother in November 1864, Poague wished that Abraham Lincoln fail in his bid for reelection but doubted that a Democratic victory would yield Confederate independence. “The Northern people haven’t got enough of the war yet,” he wrote: “There is still too much hatred towards the South and pride and Fanaticism among them to stop at this stage of the contest. They still have a sort of hope that they can conquer us. Very well: let them try.” Then Poague addressed the choice Confederates faced between continued resistance or surrender in the grinding last year of campaigning: “As for myself, although tired of this kind of life, yet I would not think of exchanging it for such a peace as Lincoln would offer. If I were to live three score and ten years, I would a thousand times choose to spend them as I have the past 3 or 4 of my life, than endure peaceful & quiet subjugation to yankee rule.”

Poague was wounded twice at the Battle of Cold Harbor and later took part in the defense of Petersburg, before finally surrendering at the Battle of Appomattox Court House.

== Post-war career, death and legacy ==
After the War, Poague worked as a farmer, teacher, and lawyer. He represented Rockbridge County in the Virginia House of Delegates. He served Washington College, later Washington and Lee University as a Trustee from 1865 to 1885. He served as the treasurer of the Virginia Military Institute under superintendents Francis H. Smith and Battle of New Market hero Scott Shipp from 1884 until his death on September 8, 1914. He also served as Secretary of the Board of Visitors for VMI. He wrote a set of memoirs entitled Gunner With Stonewall. Poague's papers are collected at VMI. A home Poague built in 1885 is still structurally sound and remains in private use as a residence to this day, on Main Street in Lexington, Virginia. Poague is buried at Oak Grove Cemetery in Lexington.

Upon Colonel Poague's passing, a tribute to his memory was adopted by the Board of Visitors of the Virginia Military Institute where they stated, "Poague was the synonym for valor. No post was too difficult, no hardship too great, no battle too bitter for himself and the renowned artillery command that bore his name. To trace his rise from the rank of lieutenant to that of colonel is to recount the most arduous campaigns and the most heroic exploits of the war between the States... that which Colonel Poague did for the Virginia Military Institute, like that which he did tor the South, need not be commemorated in words. It lives."

You can find markers in Cumberland Township near Gettysburg in Adams County, Pennsylvania with Poague's Howitzers nearby detailing his Battalion's contributions at Gettysburg. The monument to Poague’s Artillery Battalion is southwest of Gettysburg on West Confederate Avenue. A marker shows the position of the battalion’s short-range howitzers, which operated independently some distance to the south.
