= Battle of Port Republic order of battle =

The order of battle for the Battle of Port Republic includes:

- Battle of Port Republic order of battle: Confederate
- Battle of Port Republic order of battle: Union
