= Battle of Port Republic order of battle: Confederate =

The following Confederate States Army units and commanders fought in the Battle of Port Republic of the American Civil War. The Union order of battle is listed separately.

== Abbreviations used ==
=== Military rank ===
- LTG = Lieutenant General
- MG = Major General
- BG = Brigadier General
- Col = Colonel
- Ltc = Lieutenant Colonel
- Maj = Major
- Cpt = Captain

=== Other ===
- w = wounded
- mw = mortally wounded
- k = killed

== Department of the Valley ==
MG Thomas J. Jackson

Division	Brigade	Regiment or other
Jackson's Division; MG Thomas J. Jackson	First (Stonewall) Brigade BG Charles S. Winder	2nd Virginia Infantry – Col J.W. Allen; 4th Virginia Infantry – Col Charles A. Ronald; 5th Virginia Infantry – Ltc J.H.S. Funk; 27th Virginia Infantry – Col Andrew J. Grigsby; 33rd Virginia Infantry – Col John F. Neff
Jackson's Division; MG Thomas J. Jackson	Second (Campbell's) Brigade Col John M. Patton	21st Virginia Infantry – Ltc R.H. Cunningham; 42nd Virginia Infantry - Ltc William Martin; 48th Virginia Infantry – Ltc Thomas S. Garnett; 1st Virginia Battalion – Cpt B.W. Leigh
Jackson's Division; MG Thomas J. Jackson	Second (Taliaferro's) Brigade BG William B. Taliaferro	10th Virginia Infantry - Col E. T. H. Warren; 23rd Virginia Infantry - Col Alexander G. Taliaferro; 37th Virginia Infantry - Col Samuel V. Fulkerson
Jackson's Division; MG Thomas J. Jackson	Artillery	Poague's Battery - Cpt William T. Poague; Wooding's Battery - Cpt George W. Wooding; Carpenter's Battery - Cpt Joseph Carpenter
Ewell's Division; MG Richard S. Ewell	Second (Steuart's) Brigade Col W.C. Scott	1st Maryland Infantry – Col Bradley T. Johnson; 44th Virginia Infantry – Col W.C. Scott, Maj Cobb; 52nd Virginia Infantry – Ltc James H. Skinner; 58th Virginia Infantry - Col Samuel H. Letcher
Ewell's Division; MG Richard S. Ewell	Fourth (Elzey's) Brigade Col James A. Walker	12th Georgia Infantry - Col Zephaniah T. Conner; 13th Virginia Infantry - Col James A. Walker; 25th Virginia Infantry - Ltc Patrick B. Duffy; 31st Virginia Infantry - Col John S. Hoffman
Ewell's Division; MG Richard S. Ewell	Seventh (Trimble's) Brigade BG Isaac Trimble	15th Alabama Infantry - Col James Cantey; 21st Georgia Infantry - Col John T. Mercer; 16th Mississippi Infantry - Col Carnot Posey; 21st North Carolina Infantry - Col William W. Kirkland
Ewell's Division; MG Richard S. Ewell	Eighth (Taylor's) Brigade BG Richard Taylor	6th Louisiana Infantry - Col Isaac G. Seymour; 7th Louisiana Infantry – Col Harry T. Hays (w), Maj Davidson B. Penn; 8th Louisiana Infantry - Col Henry B. Kelly; 9th Louisiana Infantry - Col Leroy A. Stafford; Wheat's Battalion ("Louisiana Tigers") – Maj C.R. Wheat
Ewell's Division; MG Richard S. Ewell	Artillery Col Stapleton Crutchfield	Brockenbrough's Battery - Cpt John B. Brockenbrough; Courtney's Battery - Cpt A. R. Courtney; Lusk's Battery - Cpt John A. M. Lusk; Raine's Battery - Cpt Charles I. Raine; Rice's Battery - Cpt William H. Rice
Ewell's Division; MG Richard S. Ewell	Cavalry Brigade Col Thomas T. Munford	2nd Virginia Cavalry - Col Thomas T. Munford; 6th Virginia Cavalry - Col Thomas Flournoy; Chew's Battery - Cpt R. Preston Chew
