= Oak Grove Cemetery (Lexington, Virginia) =

Historic cemetery

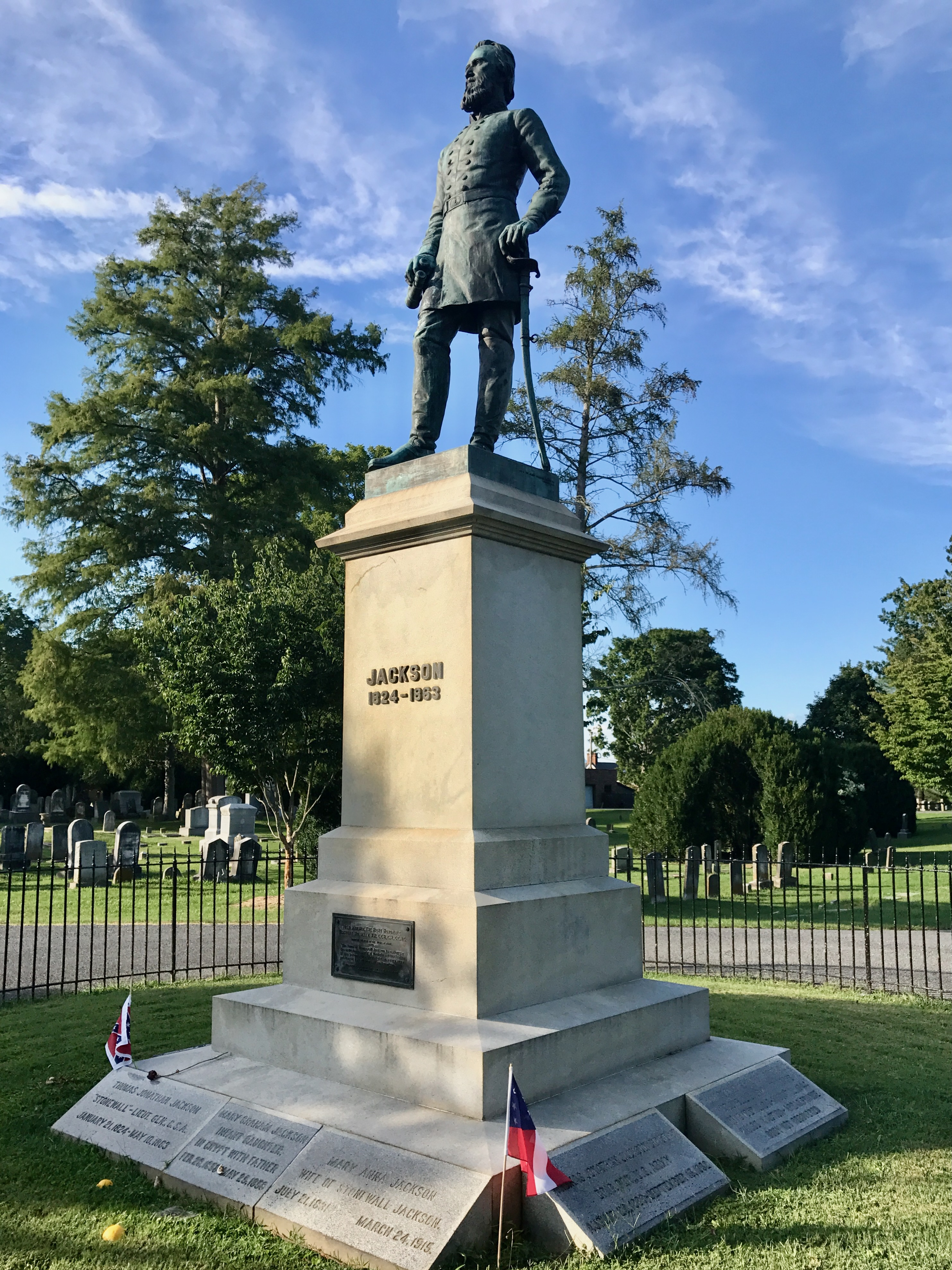
- Gravesite of General Stonewall Jackson and his family
- Interactive map of Oak Grove Cemetery

Details
- Location: 314 S. Main St., Lexington, Virginia 24450
- Country: United States
- Coordinates: 37°46′49″N 79°26′43″W
- No. of graves: ~7,500
- Website: Information at Lexington Visitor Center
- Find a Grave: Oak Grove Cemetery
- Cemetery location

The Oak Grove Cemetery, originally known as the Presbyterian Cemetery, is located on South Main Street in downtown Lexington, Virginia, less than a mile from the campuses of Washington and Lee University and the Virginia Military Institute. The cemetery was renamed in 1949 as the Stonewall Jackson Memorial Cemetery after the Confederate general, who was buried here in 1863. The current name dates to September 3, 2020. Also buried here are 144 Confederate veterans, two Governors of Virginia, and Margaret Junkin Preston, the "Poet Laureate of the Confederacy".

== Name ==
The cemetery was first known as the Presbyterian Cemetery. After the Lexington Presbyterian Church conveyed the cemetery to the city in 1949, the cemetery was renamed later that year for the Confederate general Stonewall Jackson, who was interred there after his death on May 10, 1863. The Lexington City Council unanimously voted to rename the cemetery in 2020 following the George Floyd protests, and the renaming was unanimously approved on September 3.

== Notable burials ==
=== Jackson and his family ===
The plot of Jackson and his family received a sculpture of Jackson in 1891, created by sculptor Edward V. Valentine. The plot includes graves of:

- Thomas Jonathan "Stonewall" Jackson (1824–1863): VMI instructor, Confederate Army lieutenant general, commander of Second Corps, Army of Northern Virginia
- Elinor Junkin Jackson (1825–1854): Jackson's first wife, died in childbirth; buried with their stillborn son
- Mary Anna Morrison Jackson (1831–1915): Jackson's second wife
- Thomas and Anna Morrison Jackson's two daughters:
  - Mary Graham Jackson (infant – 1858)
  - Julia Laura Jackson Christian (1862–1889) and her husband William Edmund Christian (1856–1936)
- Thomas Jonathan Jackson Christian Sr. (1888–1952): William and Julia Christian's second child, U.S. Army brigadier general
  - Cenotaph for his son Thomas Jonathan Jackson Christian Jr. (1915–1944), U.S. Army colonel, killed during World War II (believed buried at Faubourg-d'Amiens Cemetery, Arras, France)

=== Others ===
- John White Brockenbrough (1806–1870): Federal judge, Confederate Congressman, founder of the School of Law at Washington College (now Washington and Lee University)
- John Mercer Brooke (1826–1906): Sailor, engineer, inventor, commander in the Confederate States Navy
- Benjamin Darst (1760–1835): Revolutionary War Soldier, noted Architect / Builder of Lexington Landmark Structures
- John William Elrod (1939–2001): President, Washington and Lee University
- William Gilham (1818–1872): VMI instructor, Confederate Army colonel
- George Junkin (1790–1868), Presbyterian minister and educator, President of Washington College (now Washington and Lee University), father of Elinor Junkin Jackson
- Beverly Tucker Lacy (1819–1900), Presbyterian minister, chaplain of Jackson's Second Corps, Army of Northern Virginia
- Edwin Gray Lee (1836–1870): Confederate Army general, member of Jackson's staff
- John Letcher (1813–1884): Governor of Virginia (1860–1864)
- Charles McDowell, Jr. (1926–2010): Journalist, regular panelist on PBS series Washington Week in Review
- James McDowell (1795–1851): Governor of Virginia (1843–1846), Congressman (1846–51)
- Elisha Franklin Paxton (1828–1863): Confederate Army general, commander of the Stonewall Brigade, killed at Chancellorsville
- Alexander Swift "Sandie" Pendleton (1840–1864): Confederate Army lieutenant colonel, member of Jackson's, Ewell's and Early's staffs, killed at Fisher's Hill
- William Nelson Pendleton (1809–1883): Episcopal priest, Confederate Army brigadier general, chief of artillery, Army of Northern Virginia, father of Sandie Pendleton
- William Thomas Poague (1835-1914): Confederate States Army officer serving in the artillery during the American Civil War. He later served as Treasurer of the Virginia Military Institute.
- John Thomas Lewis Preston (1811–1890): Founder and organizer of Virginia Military Institute
- Margaret Junkin Preston (1820–1897): Called unofficially "Poet Laureate of the Confederacy"; daughter of George Junkin
- Absalom Willis Robertson (1887–1971): U.S. Senator, father of evangelist Pat Robertson
- George R. E. Shell (1908–1996): Ninth superintendent of VMI, Marine Corps Brigadier General
- Scott Shipp (1839–1917): Commandant of the VMI Corps of Cadets at the Battle of New Market, second superintendent of VMI
- Francis Henney Smith (1812–1890): First superintendent of VMI, Confederate Army colonel, Virginia militia major general
- William D. Washington (1833–1870): Painter, instructor at VMI
- John Delane Wilson (1931–2013): President of Washington and Lee University (1983–1995) and Wells College (1969–1975); first Rhodes Scholar from Michigan State University and member of their national championship football teams
