= Margaret Junkin Preston =

American poet

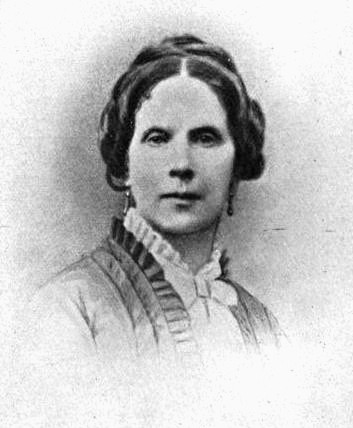
- Born: May 19, 1820; Milton, Pennsylvania, U.S.
- Died: March 28, 1897 (aged 76); Baltimore, Maryland, U.S.
- Resting place: Oak Grove Cemetery, Lexington, Virginia
- Occupations: Poet, author
- Spouse: John Thomas Lewis Preston (1811–1890; his death)
- Parent(s): George Junkin; Julia Rush (Miller) Junkin
- Relatives: Elinor Jackson (sister)

Margaret Junkin Preston (May 19, 1820 – March 28, 1897) was an American poet and author.

== Biography ==
She was born in Milton, Pennsylvania, in 1820. Her father was George Junkin, a Presbyterian minister and college president. She learned Latin and Ancient Greek at the age of twelve. She married Major John Thomas Lewis Preston in 1857, a professor of Latin at Virginia Military Institute. Her sister, Elinor (Ellie), had in 1853 married Thomas "Stonewall" Jackson, a colleague of Preston's at VMI. Major Preston served on the staff of Stonewall Jackson during the Civil War.

She wrote many volumes of prose and poetry, and published some of her writing in the Southern Literary Messenger and Graham's Magazine. She also published a few articles in Harper's Magazine. Preston's 1856 novel Silverwood is a subtle exploration of the clash between traditional values of honor and family and the new market economy that was sweeping through the United States and the Shenandoah Valley. She is remembered for espousing the Confederacy in her poems, and she was known informally as the Poet Laureate of the Confederacy.

She became blind in the late 1880s, and died in Baltimore in 1897.

== Bibliography ==
- Silverwood, a Book of Memories (1856) at Internet Archive
- Beechenbrook: A Rhyme of War (1865)
- Old Song and New (1870)
- Cartoons (1875)
- Centennial Poem for Washington and Lee University: Lexington, Virginia, 1775–1885 (1885)
- A Handful of Monographs: Continental and English (1886)
- For Love's Sake: Poems of Faith and Comfort (1886)
- Colonial Ballads, Sonnets and Other Verse (1887)
- Semi-Centennial Ode for the Virginia Military Institute: Lexington, Virginia, 1839–1889 (1889)
- Aunt Dorothy: An Old Virginia Plantation Story (1890)
