= 9th Virginia Infantry Regiment =

- Flag of Virginia, 1861
- Active: May 1861 – Spring 1865
- Disbanded: April 1865
- Country: Confederacy
- Allegiance: Confederate States of America
- Branch: Confederate States Army
- Role: Infantry
- Engagements: American Civil War:Battle of Seven Pines; Second Battle of Bull Run; Battle of Fredericksburg; Battle of Gettysburg; Battle of Five Forks; Battle of Sailor's Creek

The 9th Virginia Infantry Regiment was an infantry regiment raised in Virginia for service in the Confederate States Army during the American Civil War. It fought mostly with the Army of Northern Virginia.

The 9th Virginia completed its organization at Portsmouth, Virginia, in July, 1861. Its members were from Portsmouth and the counties of Roanoke, Chesterfield, Isle of Wight, Nansemond, Lunenburg, Dinwiddie, and Norfolk.

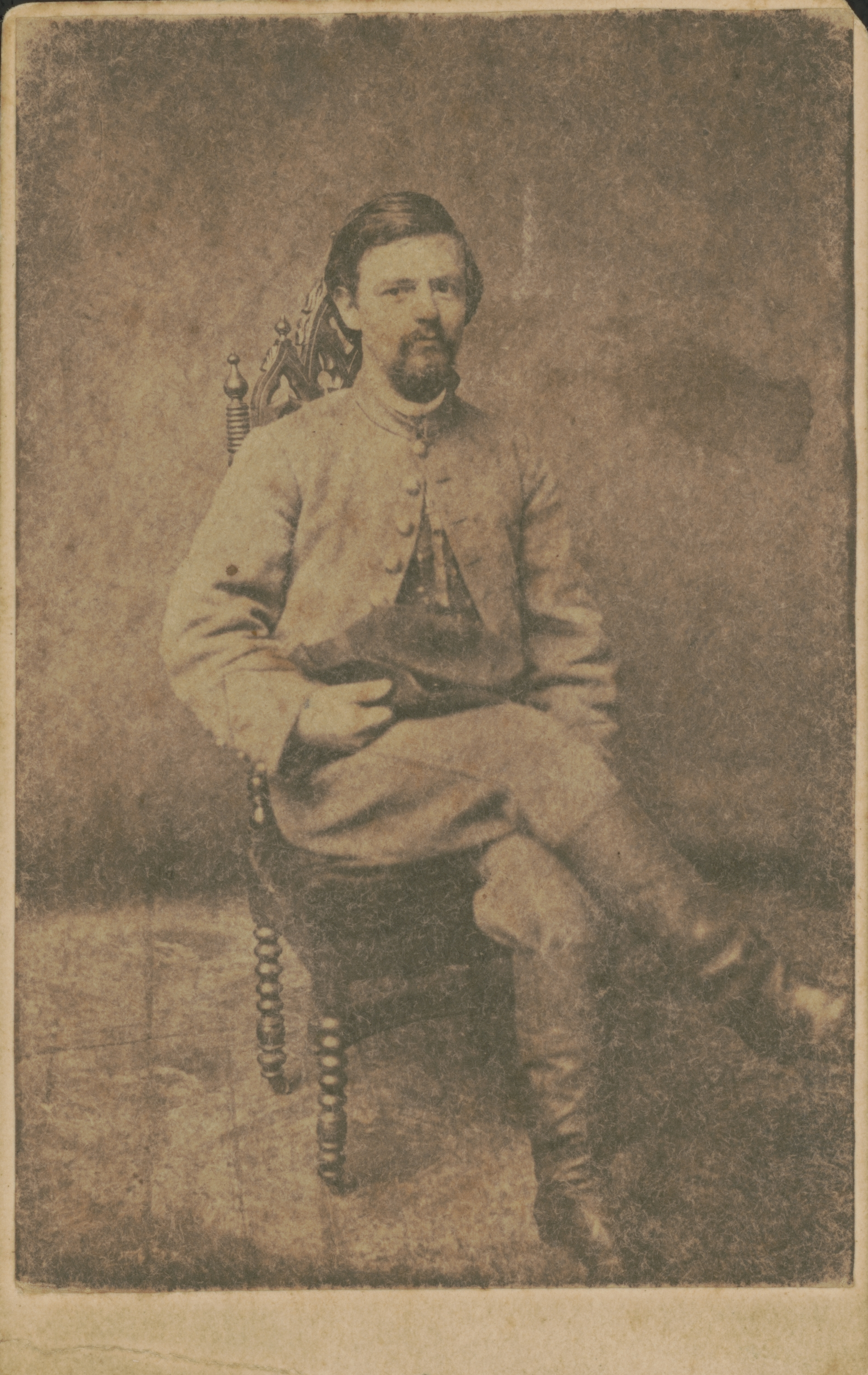
Private Joseph Lorenzo Bilisoly of Co. K, 9th Virginia Infantry

The regiment served in the Department of Norfolk and in June, 1862, totalled 435 men. During the war it was attached to General Armistead's, Barton's, and Steuart's Brigade, Army of Northern Virginia.

It fought in many engagements from Seven Pines to Gettysburg and after serving in North Carolina participated in the Battle of Drewry's Bluff. Later the unit was involved in the Petersburg siege north of the James River and the Appomattox Campaign.

It lost 9 killed, 34 wounded, and 23 missing of the 150 at Malvern Hill, and of the 318 engaged at Gettysburg more than half were disabled. The unit reported 47 casualties at Drewry's Bluff, and many captured at Five Forks and Sayler's Creek, and surrendered 2 officers and 37 men on April 9, 1865.

Its field officers were Colonels David J. Godwin, James J. Phillips, and Francis H. Smith; Lieutenant Colonels James S. Gilliam, John T. L. Preston, and William J. Richardson; and Majors Stapleton Crutchfield, Mark B. Hardin, and John C. Owens.

== See also ==
- List of Virginia Civil War units
