= James Burnes =

James Burnes may refer to:

- James N. Burnes (1827–1889), U.S. representative from Missouri
- James Burnes (Medal of Honor) (1870–?), American Medal of Honor recipient
- James Burnes (surgeon) (1801–1862), Scottish medical man in India

== See also ==
- James Burns (disambiguation)
- James Byrnes (disambiguation)
