= Blandome =

Historic house in Virginia, United States

- U.S. National Register of Historic Places
- Virginia Landmarks Register
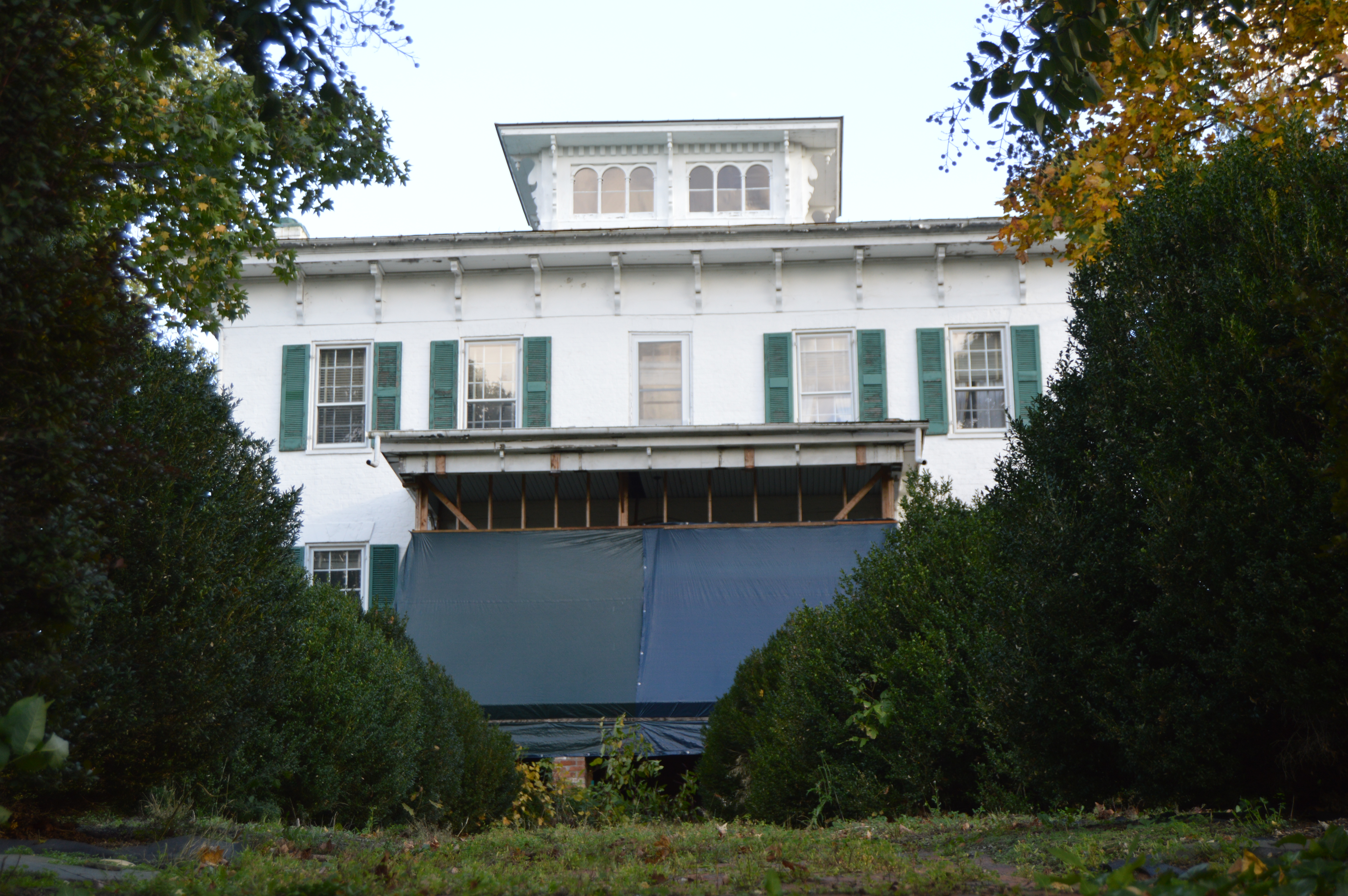
- Northern side

- Location within Virginia Location within the United States
- Location: 101 Tucker St., Lexington, Virginia
- Coordinates: 37°47′4″N 79°26′20″W
- Area: 1.9 acres (0.77 ha)
- Built: c. 1830, 1872
- Architectural style: Federal, Greek Revival, Italianate
- NRHP reference No.: 01001520
- VLR No.: 117-0027-0127

Significant dates
- Added to NRHP: January 24, 2002
- Designated VLR: June 13, 2001

Blandome is a historic hilltop home built circa 1830 and located overlooking the downtown area and within the city limits of Lexington, Virginia. Its history (and that of its occupants) shows Virginia's changing racial relations: from 19th century occupation by privileged whites ranging from slaveowners to proponents of Jim Crow, to 20th century occupation by economically successful and politically active African Americans.

== History ==
A wealthy family or group of investors built Blandome circa 1830. The builder's identity is uncertain because real estate records only became organized for this area of the city (which became known as "Diamond Hill") circa 1872, when Laura H. Tucker, wife of John Randolph Tucker, bought the property for $6500 from Jacob Fuller (1816-1890), a native Lexingtonian who was the librarian of the Virginia Military Institute (hence "VMI").

=== Beginnings through the American Civil War ===
That institution's chief catalyst, John Thomas Lewis Preston (1811-1890), lived at Blandome when his first wife, the former Sarah Lyle Caruthers (1811-1856), gave birth to their son Thomas Lewis Preston on June 2, 1835. Young Thomas L. Preston was named after his paternal grandfather Major Thomas L. Preston (1781-1812) who had represented Rockbridge County in the Virginia House of Delegates for several years. In 1844 J.T.L. Preston moved his family to a house at 110 Preston Street. The educator, lawyer and military officer had graduated from Lexington's Washington College (now Washington and Lee University, hence "W&L") in 1828 and during the next decade helped found VMI, located in what had been a former state arsenal building. VMI accepted its first students in 1839, and J.T.L. Preston was one of its first professors as well as spokesman.

After Lt.Col. J.T.L. Preston's service in the Confederate States Army (including under fellow faculty member promoted to Gen. Stonewall Jackson, who died in 1863) and emancipation of his plantations' slaves (he owned property in several counties as well as Kentucky, and the non-slave states of Illinois and Indiana) caused financial troubles, Preston returned to teach at VMI. In 1870 he transferred some Lexington property (possibly Blandome) to Jacob Fuller. Before the war, J.T.L. Preston had invested jointly in several ventures with other Lexington natives and/or faculty members. He and Jacob Fuller (or his father of the same name), were among investors in a tannery at the foot of Diamond Hill; another investor was VMI professor Stonewall Jackson. Preston could have rented or rented out the house in which his son was born. His wife's elder brother, novelist Dr. William A. Caruthers (1802-1846) could also have owned or lived in the house (before financial reverses circa 1829, or during his return to the city in 1835), since he or especially his father William Caruthers (1771-1817) owned many properties in Lexington.

The Fullers appear to have lived in Blandome in the 1850s, and by 1850 operated a classical college preparatory school in Lexington, although contemporary advertisements contain no address. Jacob Fuller owned slaves. During the American Civil War, Union General Hunter raided Lexington, and later Union General George Crook made his headquarters at the Fullers' residence. Fuller sold other houses on that street in 1873, and built a smaller house for himself and his wife below Blandome as the hill developed.

=== John Randolph Tucker and his family ===
John Randolph and Laura Tucker acquired Blandome, gave it its name, as well as renovated it as the surrounding area developed. Although sometimes given the honorific "Judge," Tucker, was like Preston a lawyer and Virginia's Attorney General during the American Civil War and active in support of the Confederate cause. Immediately after the war, he practiced in Loudoun County as well as defended Confederate President Jefferson Davis, taught law at the University of Virginia in Charlottesville, and in 1869 became counsel for the Baltimore and Ohio Railroad. Former Confederate General Robert E. Lee invited Tucker to teach at Washington College in 1870 (which was renamed to include the Confederate General's name in 1871). The Tuckers lived at Blandome from 1872 to 1875, as Tucker continued teaching and became the first dean of the new Washington and Lee University Law School. Tucker resigned from W&L to represent Virginia's 6th congressional district (the northern Shenandoah Valley and his native Winchester, Virginia) in the U.S. House of Representatives. He delivered an annual lecture series at W&L, and also maintained a home and legal practice in Washington, D.C. during that decade. In 1889, after declining to seek re-election to Congress, Tucker returned to the W&L Law School as Professor of Equity, Commercial, Constitutional and International Law (and also helped confer an honorary degree upon Col. Preston in 1881, shortly before his retirement from VMI). Tucker also continued his private legal practice (building a surviving outbuilding for use as his law office) and even served as president of the American Bar Association before his death in 1897. His son Harry Tucker continued his father's association with the W&L Law School, and in 1904 Laura Tucker sold Blandome.

=== 20th century Walker and Wood families ===
After several intervening owners (and a year after Laura Tucker's death), African American business leader Harry Lee Walker (1875-1941) acquired Blandome. Born in a cabin at the foot of the hill and with an initial trade as a butcher, Walker built a thriving business purveying meat to VMI, W&L, and various fraternities, and later expanded into seafood and groceries and also increased his wealth through real estate investments. With his wife Eliza Bannister Walker (1874-1939; formerly a nurse at Washington D.C.'s Freedman's hospital as well as a professional singer), Walker was active in the First Baptist Church and supported his wife's numerous social and educational causes, particularly as they affected blacks, women and children. Their only son Harry Thomas (1897-1914) died young; their daughter Nannie Elizabeth (1900-1993) would marry Clarence M. Wood Sr. (1899-1957) who would become his father-in-law's business partner and successor. Eliza Walker helped found the Virginia Federation of Colored Women and held their 1921 conference at Blandome. One of Walker's tenants, VMI professor, Robert T. Kerlin, also championed African American causes.

Clarence M. Wood Sr. continued his father-in-law's business and helped his wife raise six children at Blandome. Originally from Middlesex County, Wood graduated from Virginia Union University and came to edit the Lexington Star, as well as sold real estate with his brother Joseph Wood and insurance for the North Carolina Mutual Life Insurance Society. He also taught night school in Lexington during the 1930s and in the 1940s became administrator of the newly opened (and segregated) Green Pastures Recreation Area (now Longdale Recreation Area) in nearby Alleghany County. Wood also owned a car dealership, gas station and drive-in ice cream parlor by the time he died in 1957. His wife Nannie managed the various family businesses after his death and until her own death in 1993. One of their sons, Alexander B. Wood, took up residence at Blandome with his wife, Freddye H. Wood in 1997 and continued the family's community involvement as well. During their time at Blandome, significant renovations and improvements were made.

== Architecture ==
Built about 1830, Blandome is a two-story, five-bay, Federal / Greek Revival style brick dwelling. It was remodeled in 1872 in the Italianate style. The house features a metal-sheathed hipped roof capped by a belvedere and a three-bay front porch and front entrance with a richly ornamented surround. Also on the property are a contributing seven-sided law office building (c. 1890), garage (c. 1950), and ice chest (c. 1920).

Blandome was listed on the National Register of Historic Places in 2002.
