= Elinor Jackson =

First wife of Thomas J. "Stonewall" Jackson

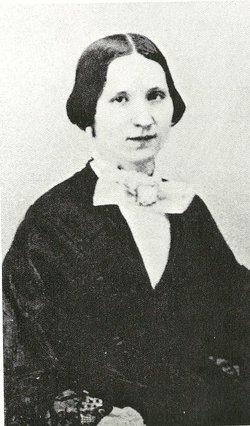
- Born: Eleanor Junkin; March 6, 1825; Pennsylvania, U.S.A.
- Died: October 22, 1854 (aged 29); Lexington, Virginia
- Resting place: Oak Grove Cemetery, Lexington, Virginia
- Spouse: Thomas J. "Stonewall" Jackson (1853–1854; her death)
- Children: 1 stillborn
- Parent(s): George Junkin; Julia Rush (Miller) Junkin
- Relatives: Margaret Junkin Preston (sister)

Elinor "Ellie" Jackson (born Eleanor Junkin) (March 6, 1825 – October 22, 1854) (Note: Contradictory sources exist for her date of death. Her tombstone and Coulling 1993, p. 70, match the existing article while Junkin 1871, p. 503 and Robinson 1975, p. 12, both report Oct. 23, 1854.) was the first wife of Thomas J. "Stonewall" Jackson. She died in childbirth a little over a year after their marriage.

== Youth ==
Elinor was the daughter of the prominent Presbyterian theologian George Junkin, who since 1848 was president of Washington College in Lexington, Virginia.

== Marriage ==
In 1853, Elinor met Thomas Jackson, then a professor at the Virginia Military Institute, at her father's home in Lexington. Jackson was a frequent visitor to the Junkin home; the shy young professor and the old college president were united by common interests in theology and Presbyterian doctrine, and Elinor and Jackson both taught at the Presbyterian Sunday school in Lexington. Suddenly their friendship changed to love, and they became engaged. But Elinor's older sister Margaret was very jealous of their relationship, and the engagement was broken off on her behest. It resumed again, however, with Margaret's reluctant blessing, and George Junkin married Elinor and Jackson in August 1853.

Her sister Margaret was the second wife of VMI founder John Thomas Lewis Preston, who served with Thomas Jackson on the VMI faculty, and served on Jackson's staff during the American Civil War.

== Death ==
The couple was extremely close, and through Elinor's influence Jackson's already strong faith deepened. In October 1854 Elinor was in labor, but gave birth to a stillborn baby and died herself shortly thereafter due to pregnancy complications. Jackson was devastated by grief but his faith supported him. The couple had been living with her father, and Jackson continued to live there for several years until he began courting Anna Morrison, the woman that would become his second wife.
