= John Thomas Lewis Preston =

American educator and Confederate officer (1811–1890)

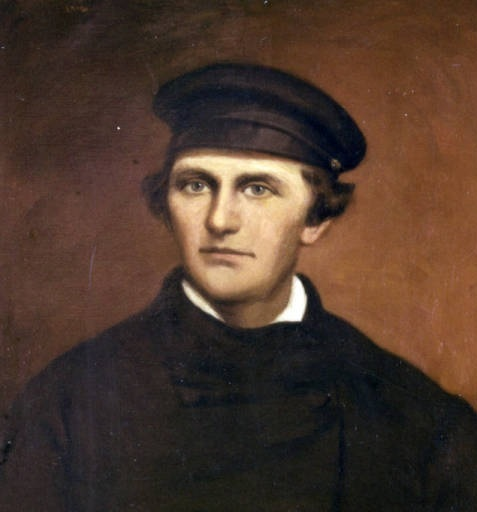
- J. T. L. Preston, in a 1907 portrait based on an 1855 photograph
- Born: April 25, 1811; Lexington, Virginia
- Died: July 15, 1890 (aged 79); Lexington, Virginia
- Burial place: Oak Grove Cemetery; Lexington, Virginia
- Spouse(s): Sarah Lyle Caruthers; Margaret Junkin
- Military career
- Allegiance: Virginia; Confederate States
- Branch: Virginia Militia; Confederate States Army
- Rank: Colonel (Virginia Militia); Lieutenant Colonel (CSA)
- Units: Virginia Military Institute; 9th Virginia Infantry
- Conflicts: American Civil War
- Other work: Founder and faculty member, Virginia Military Institute

John Thomas Lewis Preston (April 25, 1811 – July 15, 1890) was an American educator and military officer from Virginia. He was a primary founder and organizer of the Virginia Military Institute, and was one of its first two faculty members. He also served in the Confederate military during the American Civil War.

== Early life ==
J. T. L. Preston was born in Lexington, Virginia on April 25, 1811. He was raised in Lexington and Richmond, and received his Bachelor of Arts degree from Washington College (now Washington and Lee University) in 1828.

Preston subsequently attended graduate courses at the University of Virginia and Yale University. He then studied law, attained admission to the bar, and started a practice in Lexington.

In 1881 he received the honorary degree of LL.D. from Washington and Lee.

== Founding the Virginia Military Institute ==
In the years after the War of 1812, the state of Virginia built and maintained several arsenals to store weapons intended for use by the state militia in the event of invasion or insurrection. In the 1830s Preston belonged to a Lexington debate club known as the Franklin Society. In 1836 Preston made the case to the society that the arsenal in Lexington could be put to better use as a normal school for providing education on practical subjects, as well as military training to individuals who could be expected to serve as officers in the militia if needed.

After debate and revision of the original proposal, the Franklin Society voted in favor of Preston's concept. After a public relations campaign that included Preston meeting in person with influential business, military and political figures, letters to the editor from Preston writing under a pen name, and letters to the editor and open letters from supporters including Norwich University founder Alden Partridge, in 1836 the Virginia legislature passed a bill authorizing creation of a normal school at the Lexington arsenal, and the Governor signed the measure into law.

The organizers of the planned school formed a board of visitors, which included Preston, and the board selected Claudius Crozet to serve as their president. The board delegated to Preston the task of deciding what to call the new school, and he created the name Virginia Military Institute.

Preston was also tasked with hiring VMI's first superintendent. He was persuaded that West Point graduate and army officer Francis Henney Smith, then on the faculty at Hampden-Sydney College, was the most suitable candidate. Preston successfully recruited Smith, convincing him to become the first superintendent of VMI and professor of tactics.

After Smith agreed to accept the superintendent's position, Preston applied to join the faculty, and was hired as Professor of Languages. Classes began in 1839, and Preston specialized in Latin, and also taught English and other modern languages.

== Early years of VMI ==
Smith held the militia rank of colonel as commander of VMIs Corps of Cadets. Preston was appointed a captain, and soon advanced to major. In addition to serving as the Corps' quartermaster, he often acted as superintendent in Smith's absence.

After John Brown's 1859 trial and sentence, Smith was appointed to oversee the execution, and along with almost all of the Virginia Militia, the Corps of Cadets was assigned to provide security in Charles Town, where Brown was to be hanged. Preston participated in his role as quartermaster, and observed the execution. He wrote a letter to his wife in which he described in detail the events surrounding the execution. This letter was published in several newspapers, and provided an important firsthand account of the event. According to contemporary accounts, it was Preston who broke the silence that followed Brown's death, declaring to the crowd "So perish all such enemies of Virginia! All such enemies of the Union! All such enemies of the human race!"

== Civil War military service ==
During the American Civil War Preston sided with the Confederacy and was commissioned as a lieutenant colonel in the 9th Virginia Infantry, of which Smith was colonel and commander. Preston served with the 9th Virginia during various actions in the Shenandoah Valley, including time on the staff of and as aide-de-camp for Stonewall Jackson.

== Post-Civil War ==
After the war Preston continued as a member of the VMI faculty until retiring in 1882. He was promoted to colonel in the militia, but declined a promotion to brigadier general.

== Church leadership ==
Preston was active in the Presbyterian Church. He was the ruling elder of Lexington's church for nearly 50 years, and was a delegate to numerous state and national church leadership meetings.

For over 20 years before and after the Civil War Preston, Stonewall Jackson and others led a Sunday school for Lexington's African-Americans, both slaves and those who were free.

== Retirement and death ==
In retirement Preston continued to reside at his home in Lexington. He died there on July 15, 1890, and was buried at Oak Grove Cemetery in Lexington.

== Family ==
Preston married twice. In 1832 he married Sarah Lyle Caruthers. After her death, he married Margaret Junkin in 1857. He had seven children with his first wife and two with his second.

Margaret Junkin Preston was the daughter of a former president of Washington College, and became a major nineteenth century literary figure, known nationally as the "Poetess of the South" and "The Poetess of the Confederacy". Margaret Junkin's sister Elinor was the first wife of Stonewall Jackson.

== Legacy ==
The Preston Library at Virginia Military Institute is named for him. His former home, Blandome has been listed on the National Register of Historic Places since 2002.

Preston is the subject of a biography, 2014's The Father of Virginia Military Institute: A Biography of Colonel J.T.L. Preston, CSA, by Randolph P. Shaffner.
