= James Byrnes =

James Byrnes may refer to:

- James Byrnes (Australian politician) (1806–1886), New South Wales politician
- James Byrnes (sailor) (1838–1882), Irish sailor and Medal of Honor recipient
- James F. Byrnes (1882–1972), American politician and South Carolina Supreme Court justice
- Jim Byrnes (baseball) (1880–1941), American baseball player
- Jim Byrnes (actor) (born 1948), American actor and blues musician

== See also ==
- James Burns (disambiguation)
- James Burnes (disambiguation)
- James Byrne (disambiguation)
