= Francis Henney Smith =

American army officer

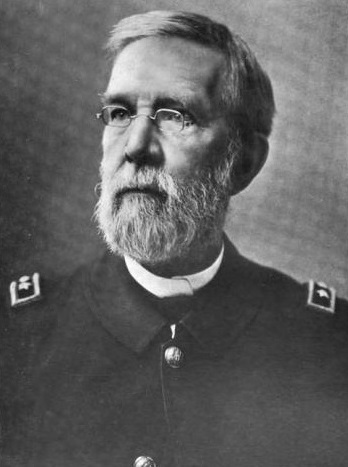
- Francis Henney Smith, first Superintendent of Virginia Military Institute.
- Born: October 18, 1812; Norfolk, Virginia
- Died: March 21, 1890 (aged 77); Lexington, Virginia
- Burial place: Oak Grove Cemetery; Lexington, Virginia
- Military career
- Allegiance: United States; Confederate States
- Branch: United States Army; Confederate States Army
- Service years: 1833–1836 (USA); 1861–1865 (CSA)
- Rank: Second Lieutenant (USA); Major General (VA Militia); Colonel (CSA)
- Unit: 1st U.S. Artillery
- Commands: 9th Virginia Infantry; Virginia Military Institute
- Conflicts: American Civil War
- Other work: Superintendent of the Virginia Military Institute

Francis Henney Smith (October 18, 1812 – March 21, 1890) was an American military officer, mathematician and educator. After graduating from West Point and a brief service in the United States Army, he became the first Superintendent of the Virginia Military Institute on its establishment in 1839, and held that post until shortly before his death. His superintendency included the four years of the American Civil War, during which he served as a major general in the Virginia militia and a colonel in the Confederate States Army.

== Early life ==
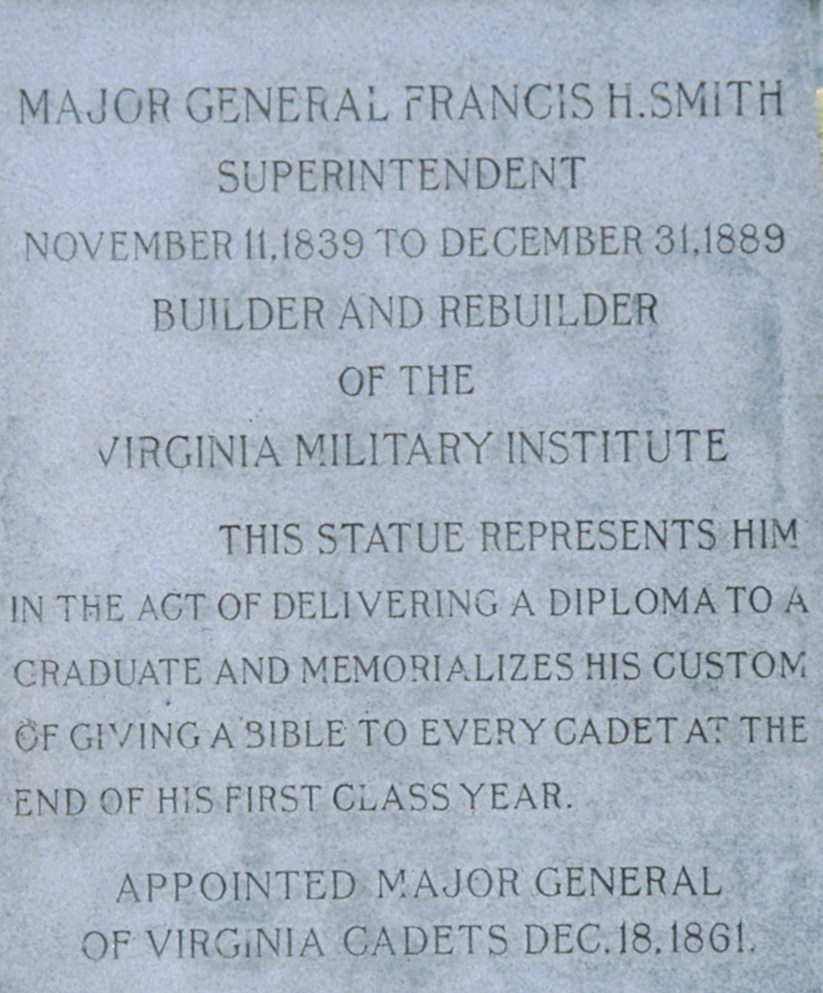
Inscription on the monument

Smith was born in Norfolk, Virginia. He married Miss Sarah Henderson on June 9, 1835 at West Point, New York. They had seven children.

Smith graduated from the United States Military Academy in 1833 and served as a second lieutenant in the United States Army until he resigned his commission on May 1, 1836. Thereafter, he was a professor of mathematics at Hampden–Sydney College from 1836 to 1839. When the Virginia Military Institute was established in Lexington, board of trustees member John Thomas Lewis Preston successfully recruited Smith to be the school's first superintendent. By the time classes had begun on November 11, 1839, Preston had been appointed to the faculty, and he worked with Smith at VMI until retiring in 1882.

Some time before the Civil War, he was appointed colonel in the Virginia Militia.

Smith was the author of An Elementary Treatise on Algebra (1858) and co-author of The American Statistical Arithmetic, Designed for Academies and Schools (1845), Best Methods of Conducting Common Schools (1849), College Reform (1850), and translator of An Elementary Treatise on Analytical Geometry (1860). Smith is also known as Sigma Nu International Fraternity's spiritual founder.

== American Civil War ==
At the outbreak of the Civil War, Smith was appointed a Brevet Brigadier General in the Virginia Militia on April 24, 1861, then a colonel in the 9th Virginia Infantry Regiment on July 7, 1861. He was often absent and returned to VMI when it reopened in late 1861. He was dropped as colonel from the 9th Virginia Infantry Regiment in the reorganization of May 8, 1862 and then was Colonel of the VMI Infantry battalion between April 30, 1862 and May 18, 1862, May 11, 1864 and June 27, 1864 and March 1865 and April 1865. At some date not shown in the references, possibly coincident with his appointment as "major general of cadets," he was appointed a major general in the Virginia Militia. He was appointed "Major General of Cadets" on December 18, 1861 according to the inscription below his statue shown in the accompanying image. Regardless whether the date of that appointment coincided with the date of his appointment as major general in the Virginia Militia, his appointments in the Confederate Army were only to positions with the rank of colonel.

Major General John C. Breckinridge was commanding Confederate forces in the Department of Southwest Virginia during a critical time in the 1864 campaign in the Shenandoah Valley. Although he did not want to use the VMI cadets in battle, Breckinridge requested that Smith send them to reinforce his outnumbered army when Union forces began to move into the valley. On May 12, 1864, Smith sent almost the entire Corps of Cadets of VMI, leaving behind only 27 cadets to guard the Institute, to help hold off the advance of the Union Army under Major General Franz Sigel from the northern end of the valley. Smith, who was ill, also stayed behind. The cadets were led by 24-year-old Commandant of Cadets and VMI teacher Scott Ship. On May 15, 1864, the VMI Cadets earned distinction and fame at the Battle of New Market as the only Corps of Cadets in United States history to fight as a unit in battle. Ten cadets were killed and forty-seven were wounded in their defense of the center of the Confederate line at a critical point in the battle. The Union forces were defeated and Sigel withdrew them to Mount Jackson and then to his headquarters at Cedar Creek, Virginia.

On June 11, 1864, Major General David Hunter, who had replaced Sigel after New Market, ordered a retaliatory attack, his troops burning and shelling VMI's campus, forcing the relocation of classes to Richmond, where they remained until the city fell in April 1865. Classes returned to the Lexington campus in October, after the conclusion of the war.

== Later life ==
Smith oversaw the reconstruction of VMI after its destruction, and remained as superintendent until December 31, 1889. He died in Lexington on March 21, 1890, at the age of 77, and is buried in Oak Grove Cemetery. His correspondence is retained by VMI.

== See also ==
- List of American Civil War generals (Acting Confederate)
