= 21st Virginia Infantry Regiment =

- Flag of Virginia, 1861
- Active: July 1861 – April 1865
- Disbanded: April 1865
- Country: Confederacy
- Allegiance: Confederate States of America
- Branch: Confederate States Army
- Type: Infantry
- Engagements: American Civil War: Jackson's Valley Campaign; Seven Days' Battles; Second Battle of Bull Run; Battle of Antietam; Battle of Fredericksburg; Battle of Chancellorsville; Battle of Gettysburg; Battle of Cold Harbor; Siege of Petersburg; Battle of Sayler's Creek

Corporal John Agee Booker of Co. D, 21st Virginia Infantry Regiment

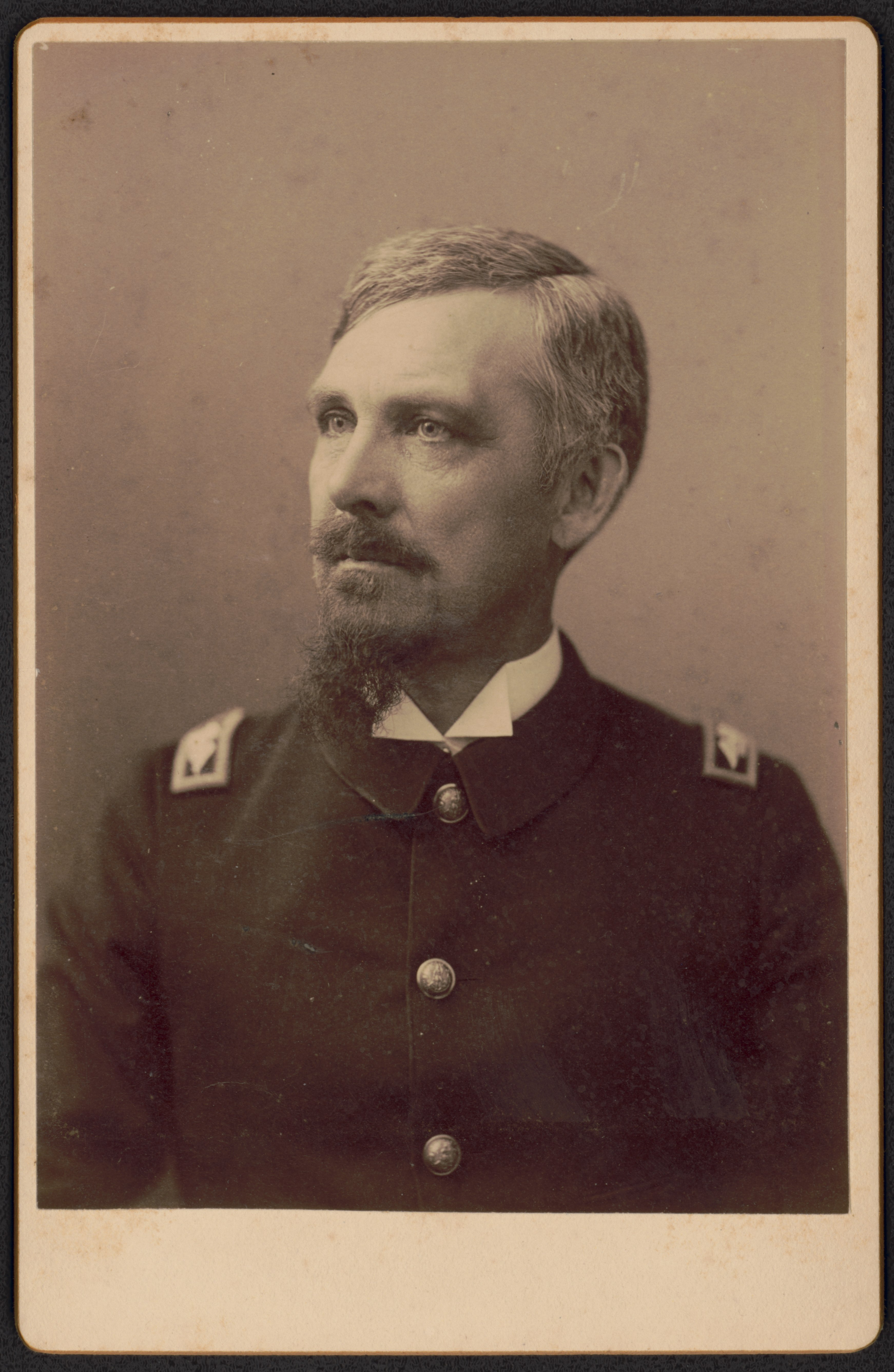
Brigadier General Scott Shipp, 21st Virginia Infantry Regiment. From the Library of Congress Prints and Photographs division

The 21st Virginia Infantry Regiment was an infantry regiment raised in Virginia for service in the Confederate States Army during the American Civil War. It fought mostly with the Army of Northern Virginia.

The 21st Virginia was organized in June and mustered into Confederate service in July, 1861, at Fredericksburg, Virginia. Most of the men were recruited in the city of Richmond and the counties of Charlotte, Brunswick, Cumberland, and Buckingham, and Pittsylvania County. Company B was known as the Maryland Guard and recruited among Southern sympathizers in the border state.

After participating in Lee's Cheat Mountain and Jackson's Valley campaigns, the unit was assigned to J.R. Jones's and W.Terry's Brigade, Army of Northern Virginia. It took an active part in many conflicts from the Seven Days' Battles to Cold Harbor, then fought with Early in the Shenandoah Valley and the Appomattox Campaign.

This regiment reported 60 casualties at First Kernstown and in May, 1862, totaled about 600 effectives. It lost 37 killed and 85 wounded at Cedar Mountain, had 3 killed and 9 wounded at Second Manassas, and reported 4 killed and 40 wounded at Chancellorsville. Of the 236 engaged at Gettysburg about twenty percent were disabled. Only 6 officers and 50 men surrendered.

The field officers were Colonels William Gilham, John M. Patton, Jr., and William A. Witcher; Lieutenant Colonels Richard H. Cunningham, Jr., and William P. Moseley; and Majors William R. Berkeley, Alfred D. Kelly, John B. Moseley, and Scott Shipp.

== See also ==
- List of Virginia Civil War units
