= James J. Byrne (US Civil War officer) =

- Born: 1841; Ireland
- Died: August 13, 1880 (aged 38–39); Fort Quitman,Texas, United States
- Military career
- Branch: Union Army
- Service years: 1861-1865
- Rank: Major general
- Units: Company I, 11th New York Volunteer Infantry; 163rd New York Volunteer Infantry; 18th New York Volunteer Cavalry
- Conflicts: American Civil War; Red River Campaign; Battle of Pleasant Hill; Battle of Campti; Engagement at Governor Moore's Plantation; Battle of Yellow Bayou; Battle of Fort DeRussy

James J. Byrne (1841 - August 13, 1880) was an Irish-American Union Brevet major general and the United States Marshal for the Northern District of Texas. He was attacked in a Apache attack while traveling to El Paso and died of gangrene a few days later.

== Pre-war life ==
Byrne was born in Ireland in 1841, he immigrated to America and settled in New York City Following the Great Famine.

== Civil War ==
On July 28, 1861, Byrne enlisted in Company I of the 11th New York Volunteer Infantry On October 15, 1862, he was promoted to the rank of Major. Within just a few months of his promotion, he was resigned to the 63rd New York Infantry and later moved to be in the 18th New York Cavalry at the rank of Colonel. During his time with the 18th New York Cavalry, he reached his top rank of General. He remained with the unit until he mustered out on May 31, 1866 in Victoria, Texas. During the war, he participated in several battles in the Red River Campaign including the Battles of Pleasant Hill, Yellow Bayou and Fort DeRussy in 1864.

== Life in Texas ==
Following the war, Byrne was appointed by Andrew Johnson to be the United States Marshal for the Northern District of Texas. However, in the mid-1870s, Ulysses S. Grant replaced him and Byrne moved to Fort Worth to work as a land agent and surveyor for the Texas & Pacific Railway. While there, he met and married Lily Loving Wroten on September 20, 1876 and they had their first and only child, Ida Delacy Bryne. However, she died less than 2 years later on June 2, 1879.

By 1880, Byrne was the Chief of Surveying at T&P Railway. In August 1880, Byrne along with a party of T&P employees, including an infamous Irishman named Pat Dowling, set off on a 600-mile trip west to El Paso to find the best route through the Guadalupe Mountains. On August 10, 1880, the party rested at Fort Quitman and were heading towards Fort Davis when they were attack by an Apaches led by Victorio and Byrne was shot in the hip while riding shotgun. He died on August 13, 1880 from gangrene and his body was initially buried at Fort Quitman, but was later moved to Fort Worth and Byrne was buried next to his daughter on November 21, 1880.
