= Jim Byrne (footballer, born 1880) =

Australian rules footballer

Personal information
- Full name: James Joseph Byrne
- Born: 25 December 1880; South Melbourne, Victoria
- Died: 27 May 1927 (aged 46); East Melbourne, Victoria

Playing career^{1}
Years	Club	Games (Goals)
1902	Melbourne	1 (0)
- ^{1} Playing statistics correct to the end of 1902.

James Joseph Byrne (25 December 1880 – 27 May 1927) was an Australian rules footballer who played with Melbourne in the Victorian Football League (VFL).
