= James Burns (merchant) =

17th-century Scottish merchant

James Burns was a Glasgow-born merchant of the 17th century and the author of the Memoirs of the Civil War and during the Usurpation from 1644 to 1661. Little is known of his history, but he is supposed to be the son of Robert Burns, who is mentioned in Ure's History of Glasgow,’ and whose name appears in the List of Linen and Woollen Drapers, commonly called English Merchants, since the year 1600. The manuscript of his ‘Memoirs’ is lost, but there is a transcript of them, which is evidently much mutilated, by George Crawford, a historian of Renfrewshire. The ‘Memoirs’ are filled with detailed accounts of the incidents which befell the nobility of Scotland during turbulent times.
