= James M. Burns (soldier) =

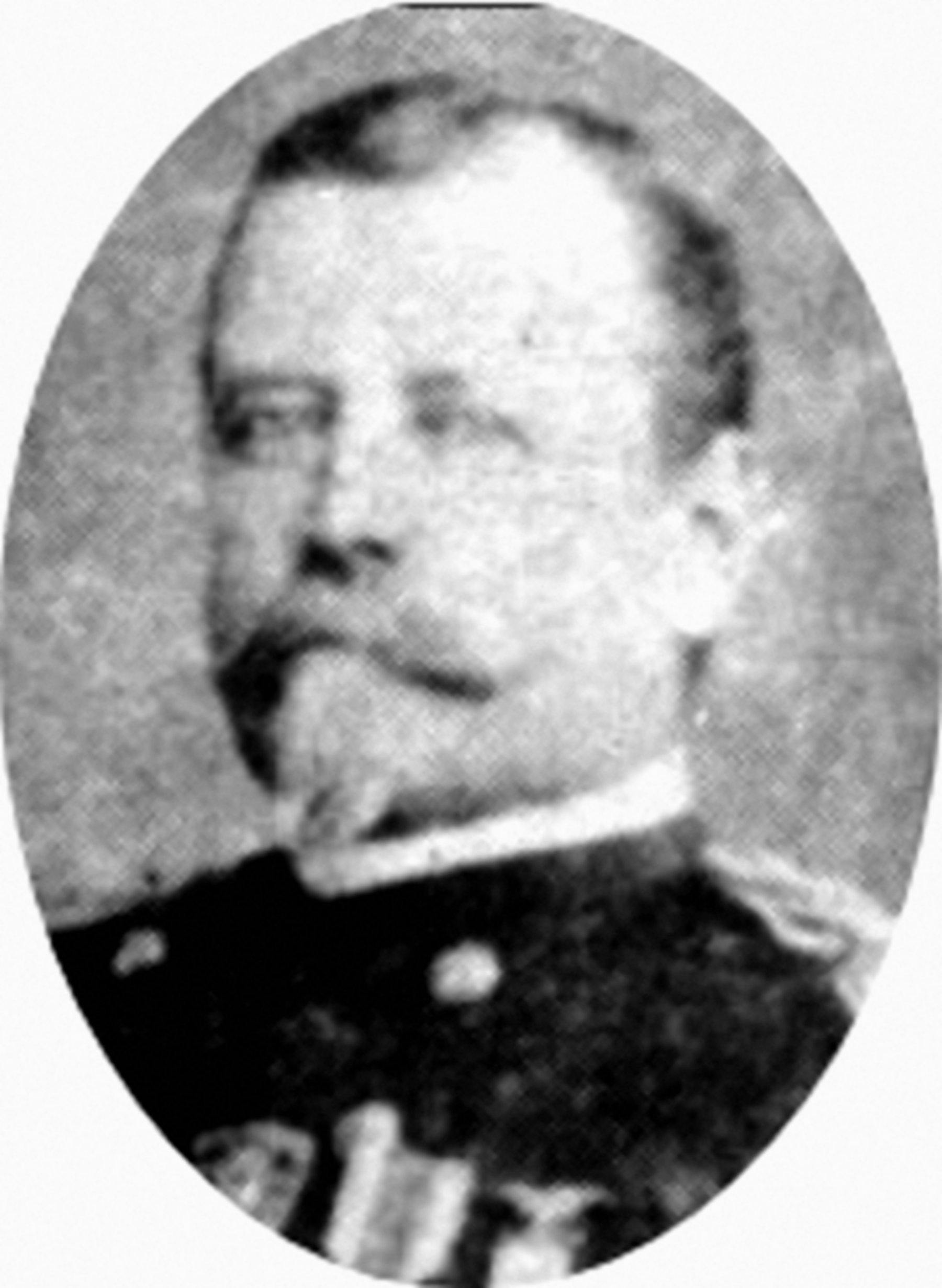
- Lieutenant Colonel James M. Burns
- Born: August 9, 1845; Wells Township, Ohio
- Died: October 30, 1910 (aged 65); Ohio
- Burial place: Lebanon Cemetery, Lebanon, Ohio
- Military career
- Allegiance: United States
- Branch: United States Army; Union Army
- Service years: 1861–1865, 1867–1899
- Rank: Lieutenant colonel
- Unit: 1st Regiment West Virginia Volunteer Infantry
- Conflicts: American Civil War • Battle of New Market; Indian Wars; Spanish–American War
- Awards: Medal of Honor

James Madison Burns (August 9, 1845 – October 30, 1910) was a Union Army soldier and officer during the American Civil War. He received the Medal of Honor for gallantry during the Battle of New Market Virginia on May 15, 1864. The original medal is on exhibit at the Virginia Museum of the Civil War located on the battlefield.

Following the war, Burns was commissioned as a second lieutenant in the US Army, eventually reaching the rank of lieutenant colonel. He also served in the Indian Wars and the Spanish–American War, until retiring due to disability in 1899.

== Medal of Honor citation ==
"William Elijah Harrison The President of the United States of America, in the name of Congress, takes pleasure in presenting the Medal of Honor to Sergeant James Madison Burns, United States Army, for extraordinary heroism on 15 May 1864, while serving with Company B, 1st West Virginia Infantry, in action at New Market, Virginia. Under a heavy fire of musketry, Sergeant James Burns rallied a few men to the support of the colors, in danger of capture and bore them to a place of safety. One of his comrades having been severely wounded in the effort, Sergeant James Burns went back a hundred yards in the face of the enemy's fire and carried the wounded man from the field."

== See also ==
- List of Medal of Honor recipients
- List of American Civil War Medal of Honor recipients: A–F
