= Scott Shipp =

American military figure and educational administrator

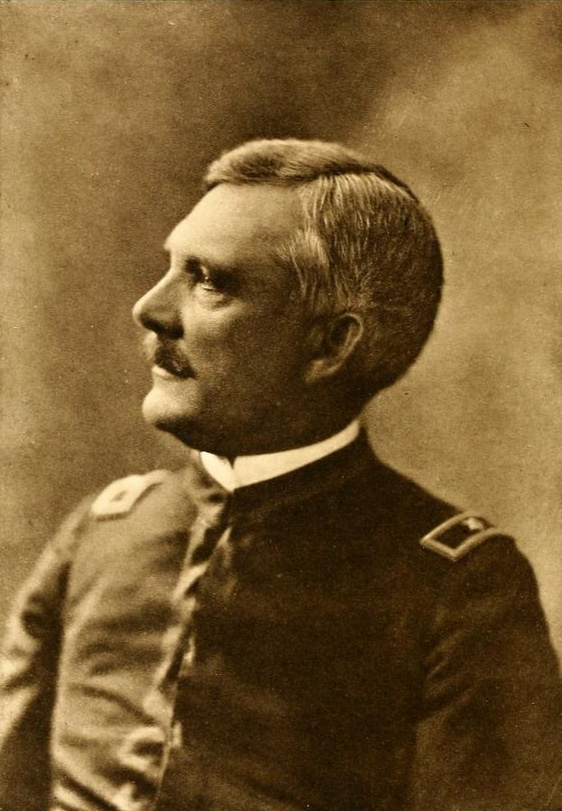
- Scott Shipp pictured in The Bomb 1908, VMI yearbook
- Born: August 2, 1839; Warrenton, Virginia
- Died: December 4, 1917 (aged 78); Lexington, Virginia
- Military career
- Allegiance: Confederate States of America
- Branch: Confederate States Army
- Service years: 1861–65
- Rank: lieutenant colonel
- Nickname: "Old Billy"
- Commands: Virginia Military Institute Cadet Battalion
- Conflicts: American Civil War: Romney Expedition; Battle of McDowell; Battle of New Market; Battle of Lynchburg; Siege of Petersburg
- Other work: President of Virginia Agricultural and Mechanical College; Superintendent of Virginia Military Institute

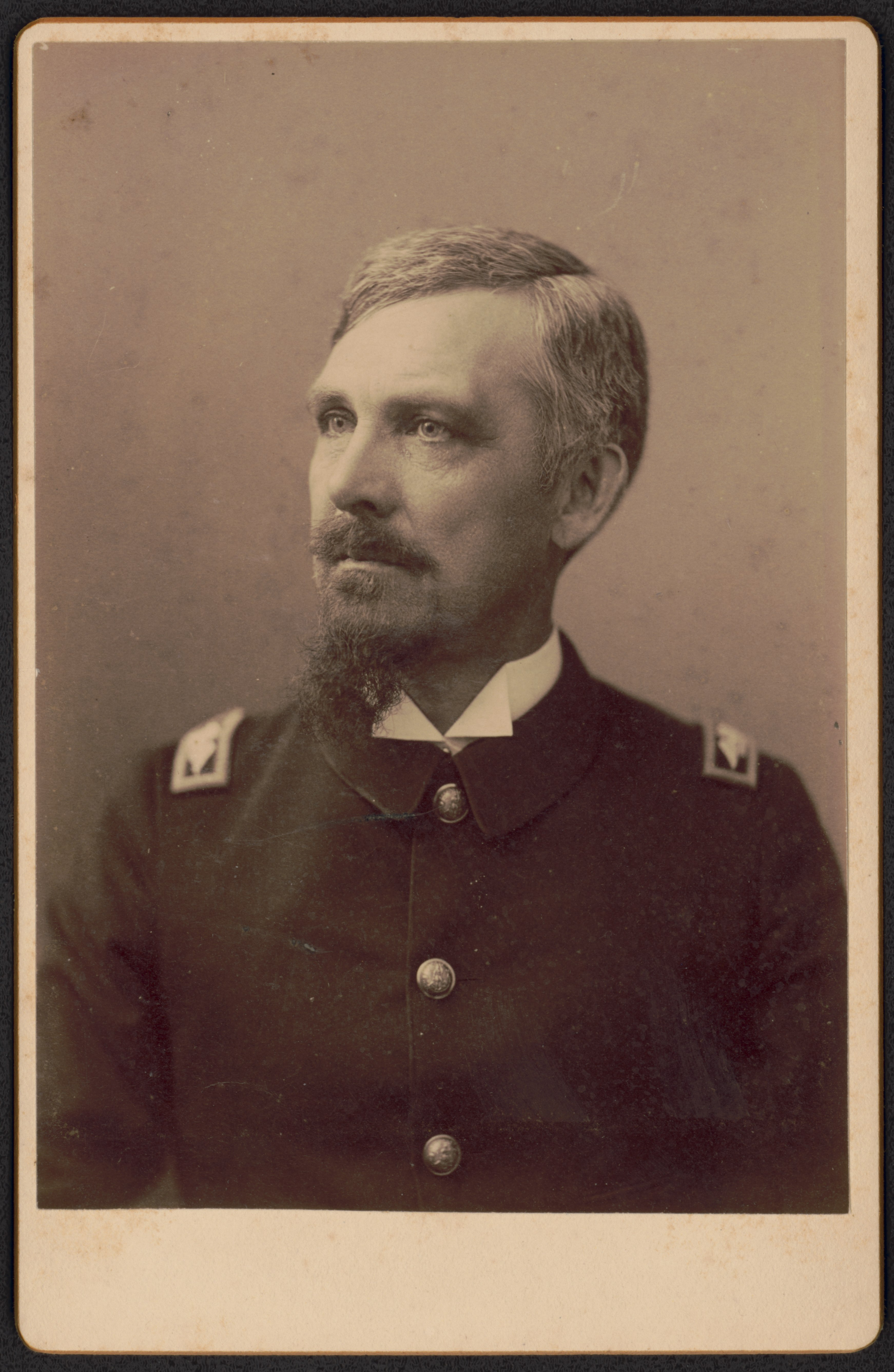
Brigadier General Scott Shipp, superintendent of Virginia Military Institute. From the Library of Congress Prints and Photographs division

Scott Shipp (also spelled Ship, born Charles Robert Scott Ship) (August 2, 1839 – December 4, 1917) was an American military figure, Confederate States Army officer, educator and educational administrator born in Warrenton, Virginia. He was the second superintendent of the Virginia Military Institute, briefly the president of Virginia Agricultural and Mechanical College (Virginia Tech) and led the VMI Cadets at the Battle of New Market during the American Civil War.

== Personal life and education ==
Shipp was born in 1839 to Captain John Ship and Lucy Blackwell Scott, the third wife of John Ship. Scott attended Mrs. Franklin's School, the Warren Green Academy, and Warrenton High School. Shipp's father died in 1849, and his mother moved the family to Boone County, Missouri, in 1852 where he entered Westminster College in Fulton. From 1855 to 1856, Shipp was employed on the North Missouri Railroad as an assistant engineer and rodman.

In 1856, Shipp returned to Fauquier County, Virginia, and entered VMI at the encouragement of Robert E. Rodes who he worked with on the North Missouri Railroad, and his stepfather, Dr. Henry M. Clarkson. Shipp entered VMI on August 14, 1856. He graduated 4th in his class of 29 on July 4, 1859, with the rank of first lieutenant of Company B. He accompanied the cadets to Charles Town, Virginia, for the execution of John Brown in December 1859.

He married Anne "Nannie" Alexander Morson, a longtime friend, on August 19, 1869, and they had three children: Elizabeth Scott, Lucy Scott, and Arthur Morson Shipp. He changed the spelling of his name to Shipp sometime around 1883. Shipp's wife died in 1884. They are buried at Oak Grove Cemetery in Lexington, Virginia.

Shipp was a close friend and colleague of George Washington Custis Lee, son of Robert E. Lee. The two were both professors at VMI before Lee left to serve as President of Washington and Lee College after his father's death. Shipp studied law at Washington College before the Civil War and earned his degree and was admitted to the bar in 1866, though he never practiced.

== Career ==
Shipp served VMI as a faculty member from 1859 to 1889, succeeding Stonewall Jackson as Commandant of Cadets in 1861 and teaching Latin, Mathematics, Military History and Strategy, and Military Tactics. While still serving as Commandant of Cadets he was appointed chair of the Department of Latin in 1876.

Shipp was elected president and appointed professor of mental and moral philosophy at Virginia Agricultural and Mechanical College, and served from August 12- August 25, 1880, resigning because of a dispute over the organizational authority of the faculty for the college.

Shipp was awarded the Doctor of Letters in 1883 and Doctor of Laws in 1890 by Washington & Lee University.

In 1890, he became the second Superintendent of VMI, taking over from the retiring Francis H. Smith and serving with the rank of brigadier general from January 1, 1890, to June 30, 1907. During his tenure as superintendent, enrollment at VMI increased by 60 percent, many construction projects were undertaken and the institute's debts were fully paid.

He was a member of the Board of Visitors of the United States Military Academy in 1890 and President of the Board of Visitor's for the United States Naval Academy in 1894.

== Civil War ==
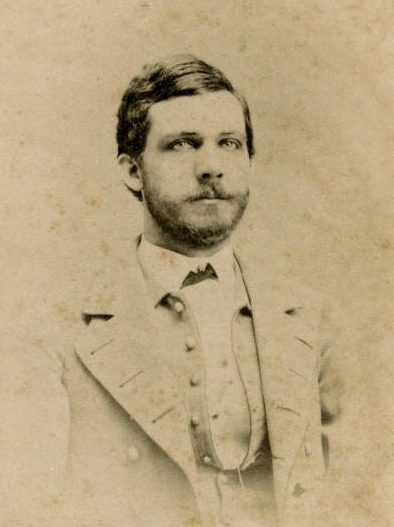
Shipp during the Civil War

After Virginia seceded, Shipp and the cadets were under the command of Commandant Jackson and were sent to Richmond for instruction. Shipp was detached to Rockbridge County, Virginia, to recruit a company of soldiers. After a few days, he was called to Camp Lee to serve as assistant adjutant general with the active rank of captain in the Provisional Army of Virginia. He was appointed a major with the 21st Virginia Infantry in June, 1861. He was with the cadets, serving under William W. Loring during Jackson's Romney Expedition in the winter of 1861.

Shipp was detailed to VMI on January 20, 1862, where he served as commandant of cadets from 1862 to 1864 and gained the rank of lieutenant colonel. Unofficial sources say he served as a private in the 4th Virginia Cavalry during the summer of 1863 while on leave from VMI. In November 1863, Shipp attempted to resign from VMI because he felt guilty for having taken one alcoholic drink, but he was discouraged from doing so.

He was well liked and respected by his cadets because of his strait-laced, solemn, yet amiable disposition. His cadets called him "Old Billy" as in billy goat for the goatee he wore. The cadets were at the Battle of McDowell but did not take part in actual combat.

Shipp commanded the VMI Cadet Battalion at the Battle of New Market under the command of Maj. Gen John C. Breckinridge on May 15, 1864, against Union Maj. Gen. Franz Sigel's forces. Just as the cadets moved past the Bushong Farmhouse and into the Bushong Orchard, Shipp was struck in the shoulder and face by a spent artillery shell, briefly knocking him unconscious, his cadets fearing him mortally wounded. Shipp said in his report of the battle that the enemy fire was so fierce when he led the cadets into battle at the Bushong Orchard that "it seemed impossible that any living creature could escape."

One cadet commenting on Shipp's serious demeanor and physical presence said he was "a large man with close-trimmed black hair and beard, a solemn bearing and a deep voice. Although he was then but twenty-four years of age, I thought he was forty."

After New Market, Union Gen. David Hunter took command of the Valley Campaign from Franz Sigel and burned VMI. Shipp was then sent to Lynchburg, Virginia, to aid Maj. Gen. Jubal A. Early in defense of that city, then to Richmond with the VMI Cadets, where they served in the defensive trenches around the capital until the Corps disbanded in 1865.

== Later life ==
Shipp retired from VMI in 1907 with the title of Superintendent Emeritus and remained in Lexington with his daughter Lucy Scott Huger and her family. His other daughter, Elizabeth Scott Tucker, died in a fire in 1901. Shipp devoted his retirement to spending time with his family and travelled to Europe. Shipp died at his home in Lexington, Virginia and is buried in Oak Grove Cemetery in Lexington.
