= Battle of Port Republic order of battle: Union =

The following United States Army units and commanders fought in the Battle of Port Republic of the American Civil War. The Confederate order of battle is listed separately.

== Abbreviations used ==
=== Military rank ===
- MG = Major General
- BG = Brigadier General
- Col = Colonel
- Ltc = Lieutenant Colonel
- Maj = Major
- Cpt = Captain

== Department of the Rappahannock ==
MG Irvin McDowell (not present)

=== Forces at Port Republic ===
BG Erastus B. Tyler

Division	Brigade	Regiment or other
Shield's Division; BG James Shields (not present)	Third (Tyler’s) Brigade BG Erastus B. Tyler	7th Indiana Infantry: Col James Gavin; 7th Ohio Infantry: Ltc William P. Creighton; 29th Ohio Infantry: Col Louis P. Buckley; 110th Pennsylvania Infantry: Col William D. Lewis; 1st West Virginia Infantry: Col Joseph Thoburn
Shield's Division; BG James Shields (not present)	Fourth (Carroll’s) Brigade Col Samuel S. Carroll	5th Ohio Infantry: Col Samuel H. Dunning; 66th Ohio Infantry: Col Charles Candy; 84th Pennsylvania Infantry: Maj Walter Barrett
Shield's Division; BG James Shields (not present)	Cavalry	1st West Virginia Cavalry: Maj Benjamin F. Chamberlain
Shield's Division; BG James Shields (not present)	Artillery	Battery L, 1st Ohio Artillery: Cpt Lucius N. Robinson; Battery H, 1st Ohio Artillery: Cpt James F. Huntington; Battery E, 4th U.S. Artillery: Cpt Joseph C. Clark, Jr.
