= James Byrne (dean of Clonfert) =

James Byrne (1 July 1820 – 23 October 1897) was a Church of Ireland priest in Ireland during the nineteenth century.

Byrne was born in County Carlow and educated at Trinity College, Dublin. He served incumbencies at Raymoghy, County Donegal and Cappagh, County Tyrone. He was Dean of Clonfert from 1866 until his death.
