= James Drummond Burns =

- Born: Edinburgh
- Died: Menton, France
- Education: Heriot's Hospital
- Occupations: Clergyman, hymn-writer and poet

James Drummond Burns (18 February 1823 – 27 November 1864) was a Scottish presbyterian minister and poet.

== Biography ==
Burns was born in Edinburgh on 18 February 1823, and was educated through the charitable foundation of Heriot's Hospital. He and two other boys got through the prescribed curriculum two years before the usual time of leaving; whereupon the governor sent them to the rector's class at the high school, something never done before. He developed an interest in religion at New Greyfriars church, under Daniel Wilkie.

In November 1837 he entered the arts classes at the University of Edinburgh, and he owed much to the influence of the moral philosophy lectures of John Wilson (‘Christopher North’). In November 1841 he proceeded to the divinity classes under Thomas Chalmers and David Welsh, and followed them in 1843 to the new divinity hall established by the Free Church of Scotland.

Early in 1845 Chalmers sent him to preach at the Free church, Dunblane and was later ordained in August of that year. Overwork soon brought on an alarming attack in the right lung, and he was advised to spend the winter in Madeira. He was appointed to the congregation at Funchal under the Free church colonial mission, and landed on 21 September 1847. His diary of this period, though chiefly occupied with devotional and theological matter, gives interesting glimpses of a poetic nature. He left Madeira on 27 May 1848 and arrived at Broadstairs on 11 June 1848. Under medical advice he was induced to return, with a view to take permanent charge of the presbyterian congregation at Funchal. Set free from Dunblane on 4 October, he sailed again on 6 October and arrived back in Madeira. In the summer of 1853 he left Madeira considerably improved in health. After preaching at Brighton and Saint Helier, he settled on 22 May 1855 with the newly formed presbyterian congregation in Well Walk, Hampstead. He married, in the autumn of 1859, Margaret, daughter of Major-general John Macdonald, of the Bengal service, and widow of Lieutenant A. Procter, of the same.

He was a noted poet and writer. Notable works include ‘The Vision of Prophecy, and other Poems,’ (1854), ‘The Heavenly Jerusalem, or Glimpses within the Gates,’ (1856), and ‘The Climax, or on Condemnation and no Separation, a sermon, with an Illustration by another Hand,’ (1865). Besides these he contributed the article ‘Hymns’ to the eighth edition of the Encyclopædia Britannica and a series of papers on the cities of the Bible to the ‘Family Treasury,’ edited by Reverend A. Cameron. His ‘Remains’ consist of hymns and miscellaneous verse, thirty-nine translations from German hymns, versions of six psalms, selections from an unpublished poem called ‘The Evening Hymn,’ 13 sermons, and two prose fragments.

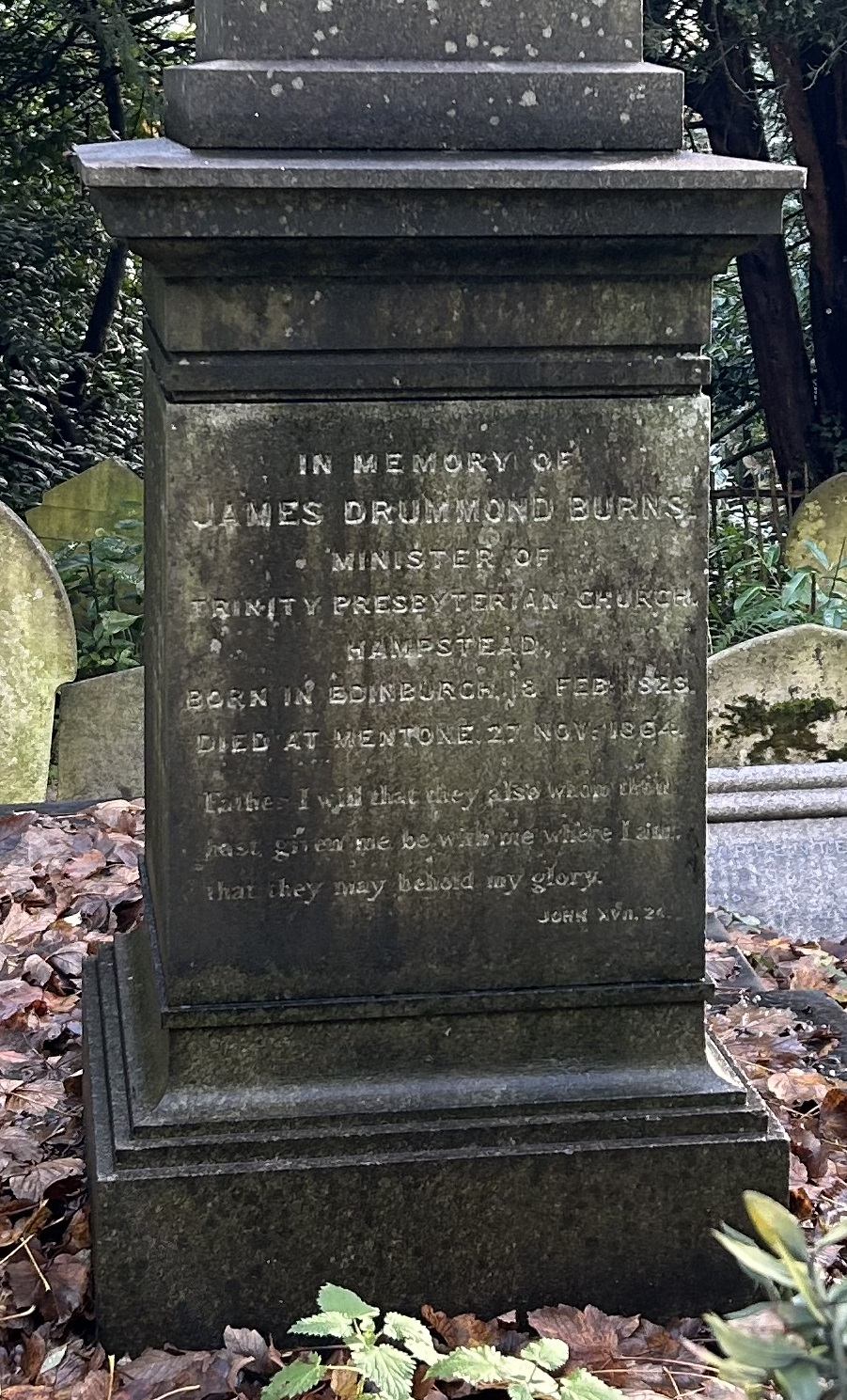
Grave of James Drummond Burns in Highgate Cemetery

His ministry in Hampstead was successful, and a new church was built. In 1863 a manse was added. Burns was a man of catholic spirit; he admitted, as a member of his church, one who frankly said he ‘was not a strict presbyterian,’ and who professed simply to be a Christian. His preaching was practical and emotional, rather than dogmatic; its effect was much assisted by a voice which is said to have resembled that of Maurice. His personal influence was stronger than his pulpit work. In the man there was a vein of kindly humour, which never lighted up his preaching.

Burns was also one of the examining board of the English Presbyterian Theological College. In church courts he took little part; but going in 1863 to the English presbyterian synod at Manchester, and thence on a deputation to the Free church assembly in Edinburgh, he contracted a severe cold. In January 1864 he went to Menton. In May he resorted to Switzerland but returned to Menton in October, and there died on 27 November 1864. His body was returned to England and he was buried in the dissenters section of the west side of Highgate Cemetery on 10 December 1864.

== Hymns ==
- "Hushed was the Evening Hymn"
