= Field of Lost Shoes =

2014 film directed by Sean McNamara

- Theatrical release poster
- Directed by: Sean McNamara
- Written by: Dave Kennedy; Thomas Farrell
- Produced by: Dave Kennedy; Thomas Farrell
- Starring: Luke Benward; Lauren Holly; Jason Isaacs; Tom Skerritt; Keith David; David Arquette
- Cinematography: Brad Shield
- Edited by: Jeff Canavan
- Music by: Frederik Wiedmann
- Production company: Brookwell McNamara Entertainment
- Release date: April 13, 2014
- Running time: 96 minutes
- Country: United States
- Language: English
- Budget: $6,000,000

Field of Lost Shoes is a 2014 American war drama film directed by Sean McNamara and written by Dave Kennedy and Thomas Farrell. The film stars Nolan Gould, Lauren Holly, Jason Isaacs, Tom Skerritt, Keith David and David Arquette. It is based on the true story of a group of cadets from the Virginia Military Institute who participated in the Battle of New Market against Union forces during the American Civil War on May 15, 1864. The film's title refers to the large number of soldiers' boots left on the battlefield due to the muddy conditions during the battle. Ten VMI cadets died in the battle.

== Cast ==
- Luke Benward as John Wise
- Lauren Holly as Mrs. Clinedinst
- Jason Isaacs as Major General John C. Breckinridge
- Tom Skerritt as Lieutenant General Ulysses S. Grant
- Keith David as Old Judge
- David Arquette as Captain Henry DuPont
- Michael Goodwin as William H. Seward
- Zach Roerig as Jack Stanard
- Gale Harold as Major Charles Semple
- Mary Mouser as Libby Clinedinst
- Josh Zuckerman as Moses Ezekiel
- Nolan Gould as Robert / Sir Rat
- Max Lloyd-Jones as Sam Atwill
- Sean Marquette as Benjamin 'Duck' Colonna
- Erik Audé as The Hawker
- Courtney Gains as Capt. Chinook
- Werner Daehn as Gen. Franz Sigel
- Parker Croft as Thomas Garland Jefferson
- Alexa Yeames as The Girl at the Dance
- William Flaman as Doctor
- Brandi Nicole Feemster as Martha Ann
- Michael Krebs as Abraham Lincoln
- Daniel Purcell as Extra in Bowtie

== Plot ==
Based on a true story, it follows a group of teenage cadets at the Virginia Military Institute (VMI) who are called upon at the Battle of New Market, in May 1864, to help defend the Shenandoah Valley.

== Production ==
The film's shooting locales include the VMI, Powhatan, Virginia, and Lexington, Virginia.

The film's world premiere was held on May 19, 2014 at the GI Film Festival. It was released in Europe under the title Battlefield of Lost Souls.

== Reception ==
On Metacritic, the film has a score of a 28% based on reviews from 5 critics, indicating "generally unfavorable" reviews. On Rotten Tomatoes, it has a score of 40% based on reviews from 5 critics.

The film was roundly criticized for its misleading depiction of Southern attitudes toward slavery. A reviewer for The Hollywood Reporter wrote "Amazingly, none of the staunch Southerners seem to hold any negative feelings toward blacks, defending the Institute's beloved cook 'Judge' (Keith David) from persecution and stopping to rescue a young slave woman trapped under a fallen carriage." Writing for the Orlando Sentinel, critic Roger Moore noted that "cadets sympathetically help slaves at every turn, even though this was the patrician class that insisted upon the war and the preservation of that 'peculiar institution.'" Nick Shager's review in The Village Voice was entitled "Civil War Drama Field of Lost Shoes Argues No Confederates Were Racist."

Further criticism came in a 2019 report by Tom Nash and Kristin Reed on the government transparency news site MuckRock. The authors, noting the revisionist nature of the film, found that the Commonwealth of Virginia had given $1 million in public money to fund the film.

== Novel ==
A 206-page novelization of the film by David Kennedy was released in October 2014.
