= William McDowell =

William McDowell may refer to:

- William Fraser McDowell (1858–1937), American bishop
- William John McDowell (1863–1929), Northern Irish politician
- William Osborn McDowell (1845–1927), American financier and businessman
- W. W. McDowell (1867–1934), American politician and diplomat
- William McDowell (cricketer) (1837-1918), Scottish cricketer
- William McDowell (musician) (born 1976), American musician
- William D. McDowell, politician and sheriff in New Jersey
- William Hugh McDowell (1846–1864), VMI cadet killed at the Battle of New Market
- William G. McDowell (1882–1938), American bishop of Alabama

== See also ==
- Bill McDowell (disambiguation)
