= Bill McDowell =

Bill McDowell may refer to:

- Bill McDowell (ice hockey), see MJHL All-Star Teams and 1957–58 MJHL season
- Bill McDowell (Australian rules footballer)

== See also ==
- William McDowell (disambiguation)
