= Virginia Military Institute =

Public college in Lexington, Virginia, US

- Motto: Latin: In Pace Decus, In Bello Praesidium; Latin: Consilio et Animis (on seal)
- Motto in English: "In peace a glorious asset, in war a tower of strength" "By courage and wisdom" (on seal)
- Type: Public senior military college
- Established: November 11, 1839; 186 years ago
- Accreditation: SACS
- Academic affiliations: SCHEV
- Endowment: $835 million (2025)
- Superintendent: Lieutenant General David Furness
- Students: 1,560 (fall 2023)
- Location: Lexington, Virginia, United States; 37.790°N 79.440°W
- Campus: 134 acres (0.54 km^{2}); Distant town
- Newspaper: The Cadet
- Colors: Red, white, and yellow
- Nickname: Keydets
- Sporting affiliations: NCAA Division I FCS – SoCon; MAAC; America East
- Mascot: Moe the Kangaroo
- Website: vmi.edu
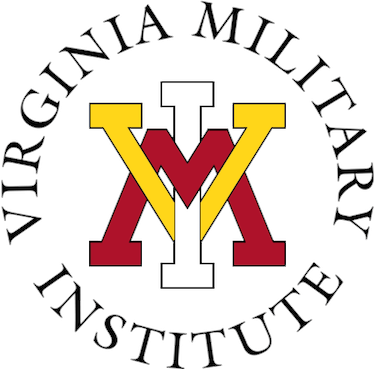

- Location in Shenandoah Valley Location in Virginia Location in United States

The Virginia Military Institute (VMI) is a public senior military college in Lexington, Virginia, United States. It was founded in 1839 as America's first state-sponsored and state-supported military college and is the oldest public senior military college in the United States. In keeping with its founding principles and unlike any other senior military college in the United States, VMI enrolls cadets only and awards bachelor's degrees exclusively. The institute grants degrees in 14 disciplines in engineering, science, and the liberal arts.

Abraham Lincoln first called VMI "The West Point of the South" because of its role during the American Civil War, the nickname has remained because VMI has produced more Army generals than any ROTC program in the U.S. Despite the nickname, VMI differs from the federal military service academies in many regards. For example, as of 2019 VMI had a total enrollment of 1,722 cadets (as compared to 4,500 at the three major Service Academies) making it one of the smallest NCAA Division I schools in the United States. All VMI cadets must participate in two years of the Reserve Officers' Training Corps (ROTC) of the United States Armed Forces programs, but are afforded the flexibility of pursuing civilian endeavors or accepting an officer's commission in the active or reserve components of one of the six U.S. military branches upon graduation. Approximately 65% of VMI graduates enter the military upon graduation, making it one of the largest producers of officers for the United States Army and Marine Corps each year.

== Governance ==
The Board of Visitors is the supervisory board of the Virginia Military Institute. Although the governor is ex officio the commander-in-chief of the institute, and no one may be declared a graduate without their signature, they delegate to the board the responsibility for developing the institute's policy. The board appoints the superintendent and approves appointment of members of the faculty and staff on the recommendation of the superintendent. The board may make bylaws and regulations for their own government and the management of the affairs of the institute, and while the institute is exempt from the Administrative Process Act in accordance with Va. Code (which exempts educational institutions operated by the Commonwealth), some of its regulations are codified at 8VAC 100. The Executive Committee conducts the business of the board during recesses.

The board has 17 members, including ex officio the adjutant general of the Commonwealth of Virginia. Regular members are appointed by the governor for a four-year term and may be reappointed once. Of the sixteen appointed members, twelve must be alumni of the institute, eight of whom must be residents of Virginia and four must be non-residents; and the remaining four members must be non-alumni Virginia residents. The Executive Committee consists of the board's president, three vice presidents, and one non-alumnus at large, and is appointed by the board at each annual meeting.

Under the militia bill (the pre-civil-war Virginia Code of 1860) officers of the institute were recognized as part of the military establishment of the state, and the governor had authority to issue commissions to them in accordance with institute regulations. Current law makes provision for officers of the Virginia Militia to be subject to orders of the governor. The cadets are a military corps (the Corps of Cadets) under the command of the superintendent and under the administration of the Commandant of Cadets, and constitute the guard of the institute.

== History ==
Aerial view of the Virginia Military Institute campus

=== Early history ===
In the years after the War of 1812, the Commonwealth of Virginia built and maintained several arsenals to store weapons intended for use by the state militia in the event of invasion or slave revolt. One of them was placed in Lexington. Residents came to resent the presence of the soldiers, whom they saw as drunken and undisciplined. In 1826, one guard beat another to death. Townspeople wanted to keep the arsenal, but sought a new way of guarding it, so as to eliminate the "undesirable element."

In 1834, the Franklin Society, a local literary and debate society, debated, "Would it be politic for the State to establish a military school, at the Arsenal, near Lexington, in connection with Washington College, on the plan of the West Point Academy?" They unanimously concluded that it would. Lexington attorney John Thomas Lewis Preston became the most active advocate of the proposal. In a series of three anonymous letters in the Lexington Gazette in 1835, he proposed replacing the arsenal guard with students living under military discipline, receiving some military education, as well as a liberal education. The school's graduates would contribute to the development of the state and, should the need arise, provide trained officers for the state's militia.

After a public relations campaign that included Preston meeting in person with influential business, military and political figures and many open letters from prominent supporters, in 1836 the Virginia legislature passed a bill authorizing creation of a school at the Lexington arsenal, and the Governor signed the measure into law.

The organizers of the planned school formed a board of visitors, which included Preston, and the board selected Claudius Crozet as their first president. Crozet had served as an engineer in Napoleon Bonaparte's army before immigrating to the United States. In America, he served as an engineering professor at West Point, as well as state engineer in Louisiana and mathematics professor at Jefferson College in Convent, Louisiana. Crozet was also the Chief Engineer of Virginia and someone whom Thomas Jefferson referred to as, "the smartest mathematician in the United States." The board delegated to Preston the task of deciding what to call the new school, and he created the name Virginia Military Institute.

Under Crozet's direction, the board of visitors crafted VMI's program of instruction, basing it off of those of the United States Military Academy and Crozet's alma mater the École Polytechnique of Paris. So, instead of the mix of military and liberal education imagined by Preston, the board created a military and engineering school offering the most thorough engineering curriculum in America, outside of West Point.

Preston was also tasked with hiring VMI's first superintendent. He was persuaded that West Point graduate and former army officer Francis Henney Smith, then professor of mathematics at Hampden–Sydney College, was the most suitable candidate. Preston successfully recruited Smith, and convinced him to become the first superintendent and Professor of Tactics.

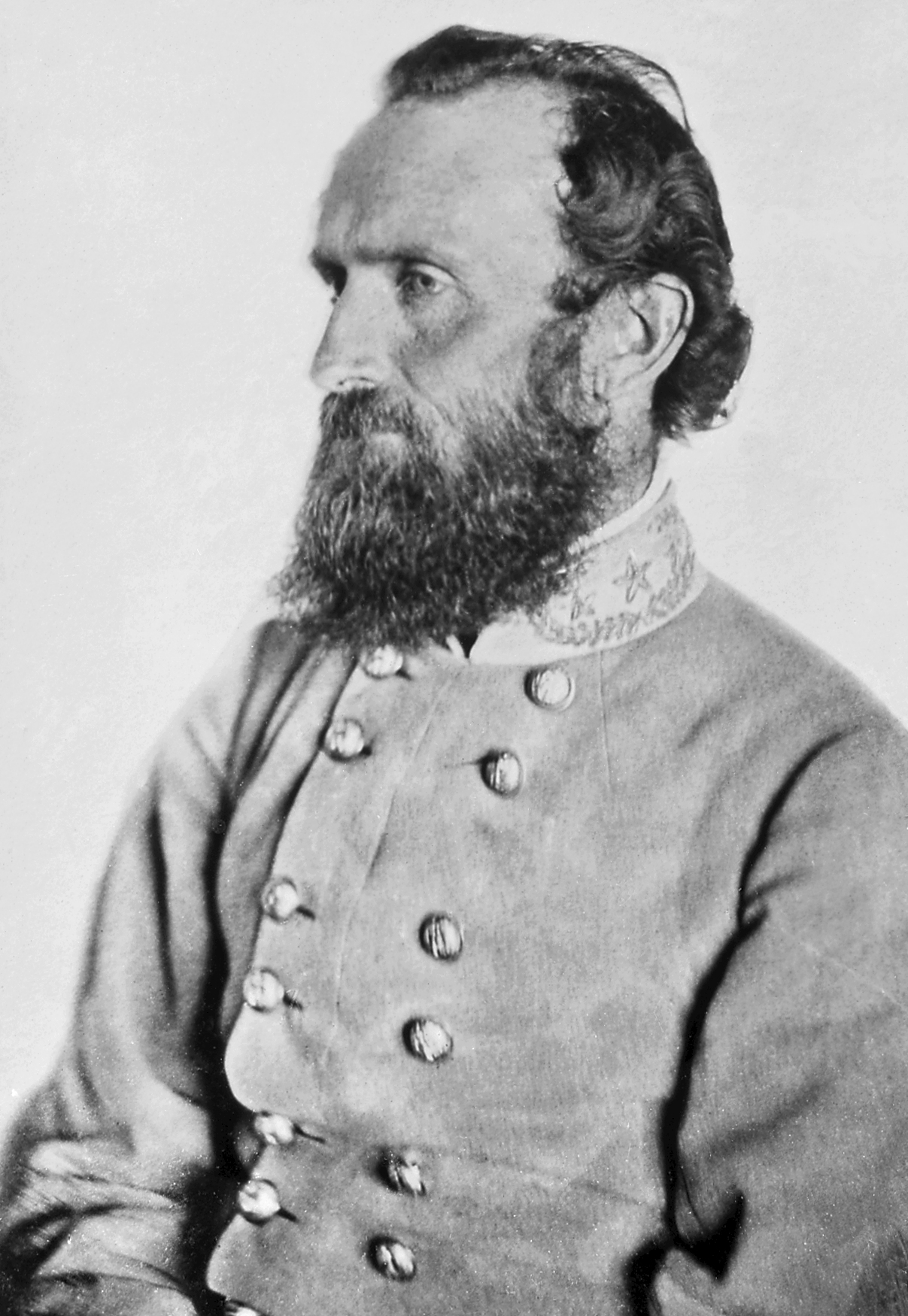
VMI professor, Stonewall Jackson

After Smith agreed to accept the superintendent's position, Preston applied to join the faculty, and was hired as Professor of Languages. At first, from 1836 to 1839, the institution was functionally a department of Washington College. The first class consisted of 30 regular cadets, and 13 paying cadets. Thanks to funding by the Virginia Society of the Cincinnati, the school was able to formally separate from Washington College on November 11, 1839, although by agreement it continued to provide services to that school's students for the next six years. Practical military training began at VMI in the spring of 1840.

In 1839, the first cadet to march a sentinel post was Private John Strange. With few exceptions, there have been sentinels posted at VMI every hour of every day of the school year since November 11, 1839.

The Class of 1842 graduated 16 cadets. Living conditions were poor until 1850 when the cornerstone of the new barracks was laid. In 1851 Thomas "Stonewall" Jackson became a member of the faculty and professor of Natural and Experimental Philosophy. Under Major Jackson and Major William Gilham, VMI infantry and artillery units were present at the hanging of John Brown at Charles Town, Virginia (now West Virginia) in 1859.

=== Founding of the VMI Museum ===
In a letter dated February 27, 1845, addressed to William S. Beale, VMI Class of 1843, Superintendent Smith solicited items to create an Institute museum to inspire and educate cadets. Superintendent Smith accepted a donation of a Revolutionary War musket in 1856, thus establishing the first public museum in the Commonwealth of Virginia. For the first 75 years the museum was a "special collection" administered by the VMI library, a common model still in use by many colleges and universities.

In the early 20th century, the collection was organized as a public resource and took the form of a modern museum. In 1970, the museum was recognized as its own department, and was professionally accredited by the American Alliance of Museums. Today the VMI Museum System consists of the VMI Museum on the VMI Post, the Virginia Museum of the Civil War located at the 300-acre New Market Battlefield State Historical Park; and the Jackson House, interpreting the life of VMI Professor Thomas J. (later "Stonewall") Jackson and his household on the eve of Civil War. The main museum contains more than 20,000 artifacts, including the mounted hide of Little Sorrel, Stonewall Jackson's horse, displays about the seven Medals of Honor awarded to VMI alumni, the career of Gen. George C. Marshall (VMI Class of 1901), and the Stewart Firearms Collection, which totals over 800 pieces.

=== Civil War period ===
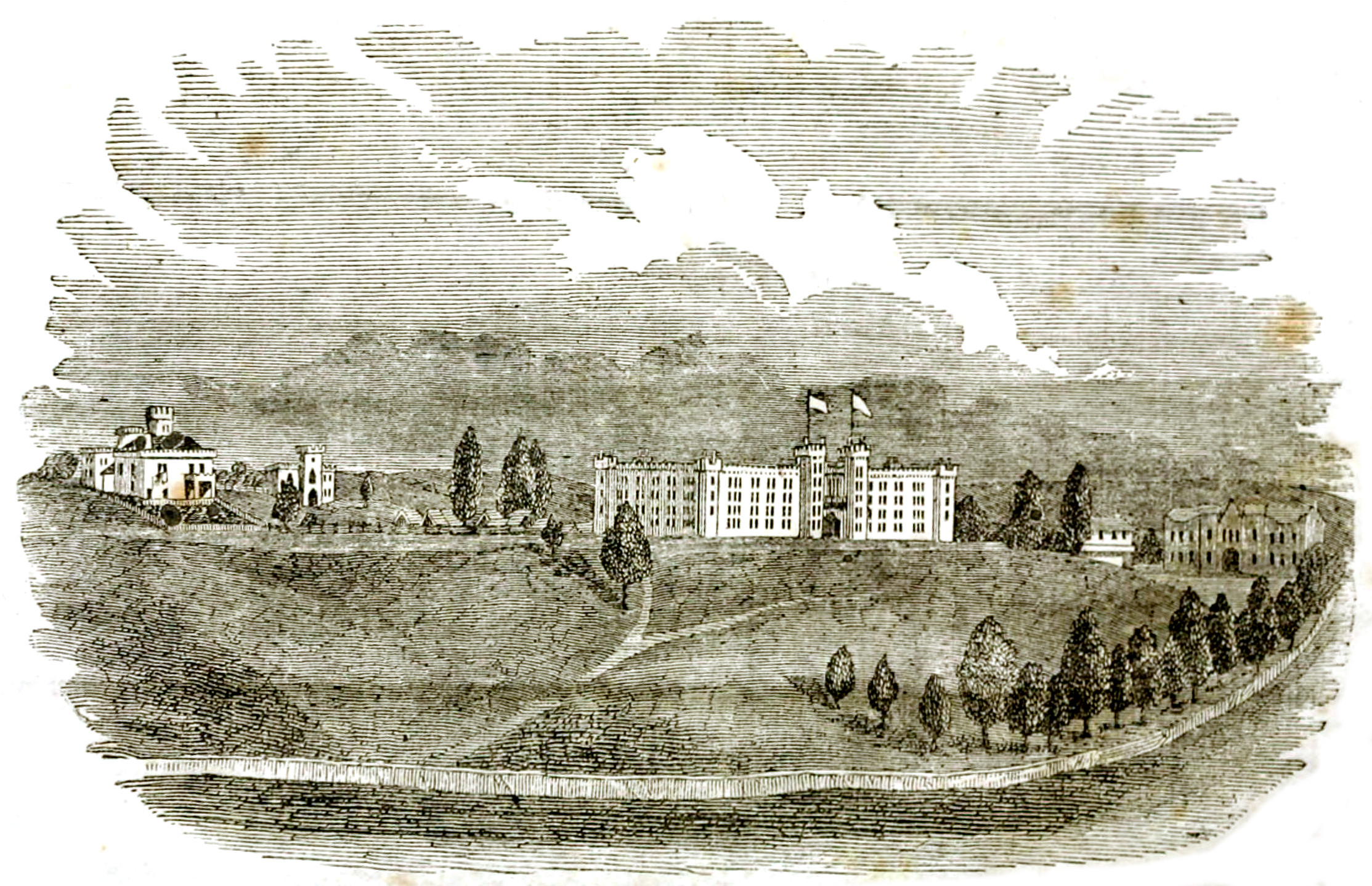
Engraving of VMI, c. 1863

VMI cadets and alumni played instrumental roles in the American Civil War, primarily on the Confederate side. On 14 occasions, the Confederacy called cadets into active military engagements. VMI authorized battle streamers for each one of these engagements but chose to carry only one: the battle streamer for New Market. Many VMI Cadets were ordered to Camp Lee, at Richmond, to train recruits under Stonewall Jackson.

During the war, approximately 1,800 VMI alumni served the South (including 19 in the U.S. Army), with about 250 of them killed in action. VMI alumni were regarded among the best officers, and several distinguished themselves in the Union forces as well. Fifteen graduates rose to the rank of general in the Confederate Army, and one rose to this rank in the Union Army. Just before his famous flank attack at the Battle of Chancellorsville, Jackson looked at his division and brigade commanders, noted the high number of VMI graduates and said, "The Institute will be heard from today." Two of Jackson's four division commanders at Chancellorsville, Generals Robert Rodes and Raleigh Colston, were VMI graduates as were more than twenty of his brigadiers and colonels.

==== Battle of New Market ====
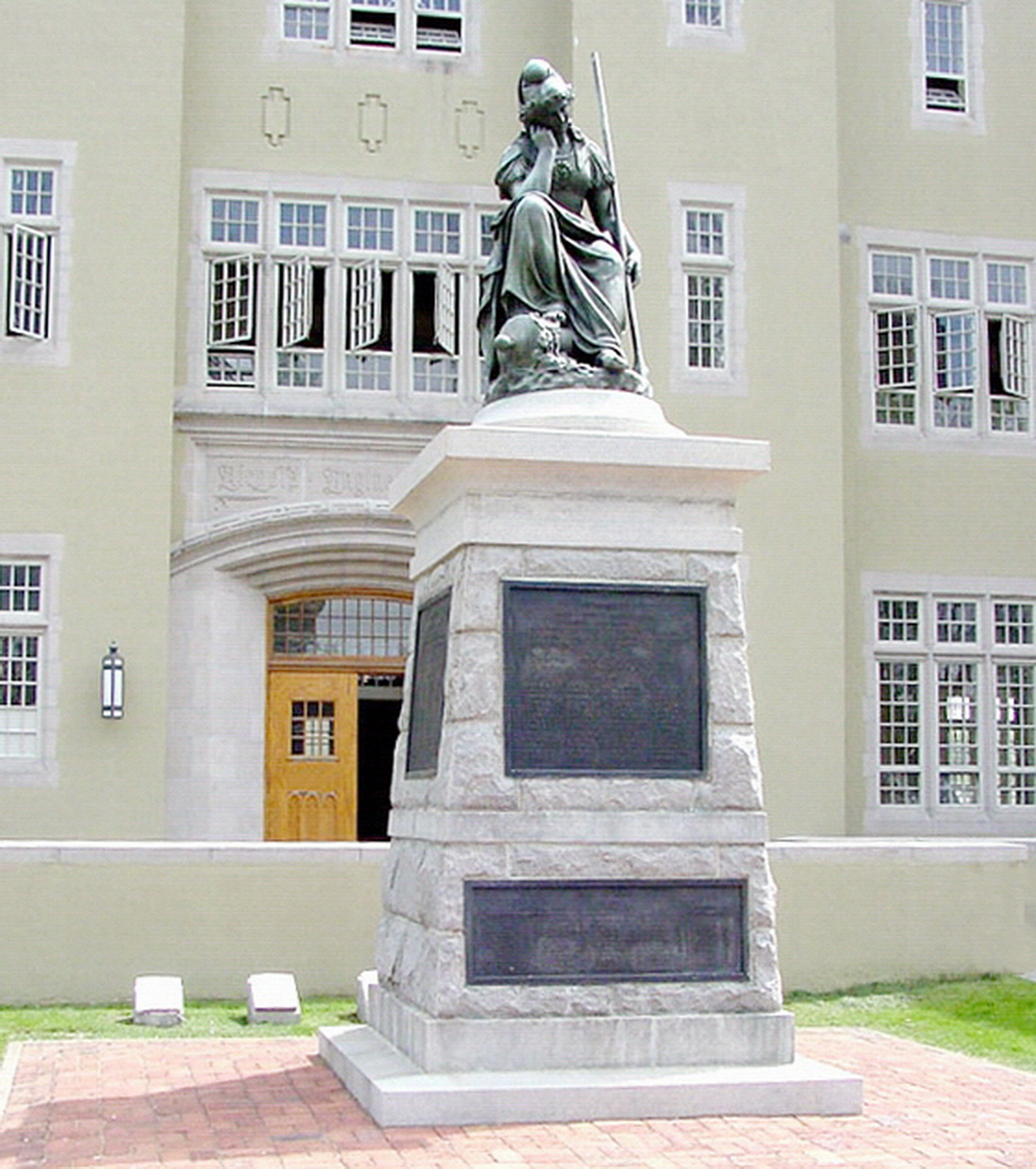
Virginia Mourning Her Dead

On May 14, 1864, the governor of Virginia called upon the cadets from VMI to service. After marching overnight 80 miles (129 km) from Lexington to New Market, on May 15, 1864, 247 cadets then fought at the Battle of New Market, marking the only time in U.S. history wherein the student body of an operating college fought as an organized unit in pitched combat in battle (as recognized by the American Battlefield Trust).

General John C. Breckinridge, the commanding Southern general, had held the cadets in reserve and did not use them until Union troops broke through the Confederate lines. Upon seeing the tide of battle turning in favor of the Union forces, Breckinridge stated, "Put the boys in...and may God forgive me for the order." The VMI cadets held the line and eventually pushed forward across an open muddy field, capturing a Union artillery emplacement, and helping to secure victory for the Confederates. In a matter of minutes, VMI suffered fifty-five casualties with another five cadets killed in action; the cadets were led into battle by the Commandant of Cadets and future VMI Superintendent Colonel Scott Shipp. Shipp was also wounded during the battle.

The VMI battalion (of infantry and artillery) received an institutional battle streamer for its part in the battle of New Market, one of only five American institutions to be awarded such an honor.

===== List of cadet deaths =====
Five cadets were killed in action on May 15:

Cadet	Hometown	Rank and Company	notes
William Henry Cabell Class of 1865 (Junior)	Richmond, Virginia	Cadet First Sergeant Company D	Killed in action. Buried at Hollywood Cemetery, Richmond
Charles Gay Crockett Class of 1867 (Freshman)	Wythe County, Virginia	Cadet Private Company D	Killed in action. Reinterred at VMI in 1960.
Henry Jenner Jones Class of 1867 (Freshman)	King William County, Virginia	Cadet Private Company D	Killed in action. Buried at VMI.
William Hugh McDowell Class of 1867 (Freshman)	Beattie's Ford, North Carolina	Cadet Private Company B	Killed in action. Buried at VMI.
Jaqueline Beverly Stanard Class of 1867 (Freshman)	Orange, Virginia	Cadet Private Company B	Killed in action. Buried in Orange, Virginia.

In addition, five of those wounded in the battle later died of their wounds:

Cadet	Hometown	Rank and Company	notes
Samuel Francis Atwill Class of 1866 (Sophomore)	Atwillton, Virginia	Cadet Corporal Company A	Died on July 20 at the home of Dr. Stribling in Staunton. Buried at VMI. ‣ Promoted to Cadet Third Sergeant, Company C on June 27, 1864, but never served
Alva Curtis Hartsfield Class of 1866 (Sophomore)	Wake County, North Carolina	Cadet Private Company D	Died on June 26 in a Petersburg hospital. Buried in an unmarked grave in Blandford Church Cemetery, Petersburg. ‣ Listed under Company B on the monument
Luther Cary Haynes Class of 1867 (Freshman)	Essex County, Virginia	Cadet Private Company B	Died on June 15 at the old Powhatan Hotel Hospital (Huguenot Springs Convalescent Hospital), Richmond. Buried at his family home "Sunny Side".
Thomas Garland Jefferson Class of 1867 (Freshman)	Amelia County, Virginia	Cadet Private Company B	Died May 18 in a nearby private home. Buried at VMI.
Joseph Christopher Wheelwright Class of 1867 (Freshman)	Westmoreland County, Virginia	Cadet Private Company C	Died on June 2 at the home of a doctor in Harrisonburg. Buried at VMI.

Another cadet, William D. Buster, died of typhoid while on service in Richmond in April 1865.

==== Burning of the Institute ====
On June 12, 1864, a month after New Market, Union forces, under the command of General David Hunter, shelled and burned the Institute as part of the Valley Campaigns of 1864. The museum was also destroyed (but was later reopened in 1870). The destruction of the buildings was almost complete, and VMI had to temporarily hold classes at the Alms House in Richmond, Virginia. One of the reasons that Confederate General Jubal A. Early burned the town of Chambersburg, Pennsylvania, was in retaliation for the destruction of VMI.

=== Post Civil War ===
In April 1865, Richmond was evacuated due to the impending fall of Petersburg and the VMI Corps of Cadets was disbanded. The Lexington campus reopened for classes on October 17, 1865 with Francis H. Smith returning as superintendent. VMI went on to become a model for other institutions in the South, including Louisiana State University and Texas A&M.

After the war, Matthew Fontaine Maury, the pioneering oceanographer known as the "Pathfinder of the Seas", accepted a teaching position at VMI, holding the physics chair. John Mercer Brooke also joined the school. Similarly, David Hunter Strother, who was chief of staff to General Hunter and had advised the destruction of the institute, served as Adjutant General of the Virginia Militia and member of the VMI Board of Visitors; in that position he promoted and worked actively for the reconstruction. Scott Shipp, who led cadets at New Market, became the school's second superintendent in 1890.

In 1903, a statue sculpted by Moses Ezekiel, a VMI cadet who had fought and was wounded at New Market, called Virginia Mourning Her Dead, was dedicated. Six of the ten fallen cadets are now buried on VMI grounds behind the statue. In 1912, another statue by Ezekiel, a relica statue of General Jackson, was also donated to the VMI.

=== World War II ===
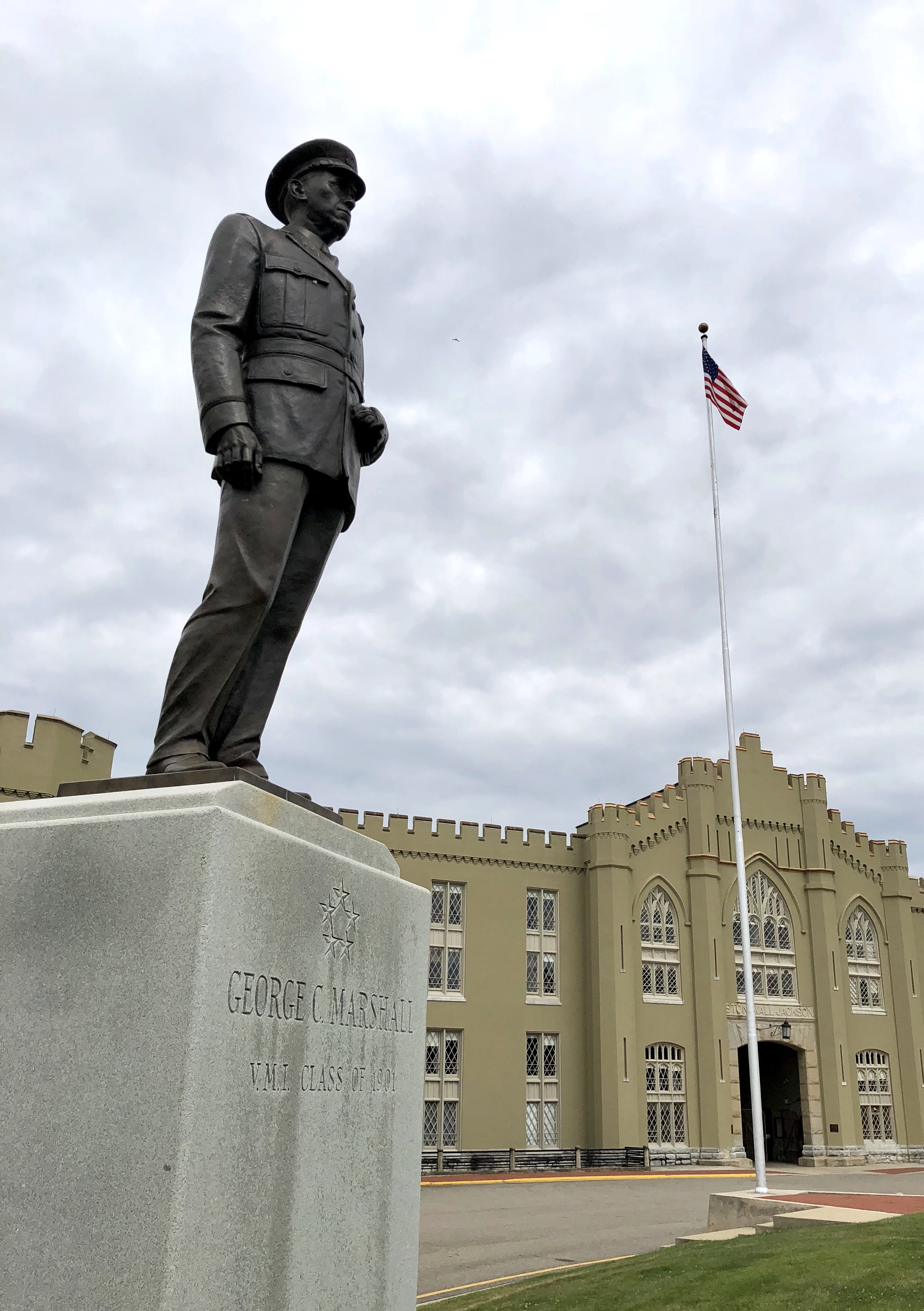
George C. Marshall statue

VMI produced many of America's commanders in World War II. The most important of these was George C. Marshall (class of 1901), the top U.S. Army general during the war. Marshall was the Army's first five-star general and the only career military officer ever to win the Nobel Peace Prize. Winston Churchill dubbed Marshall the "Architect of Victory" and "the noblest Roman of them all". The Deputy Chief of Staff of the U.S. Army during the war was also a VMI graduate as were the Second U.S. Army commander, 15th U.S. Army commander, the commander of Allied Air Forces of the Southwest Pacific and various corps and division commanders in the Army and Marine Corps. China's General Sun Li-jen, known as the "Rommel of the East", was also a graduate of VMI.

During the war, VMI participated in the War Department's Army Specialized Training Program (ASTP) from 1943 to 1946. The program provided training in engineering and related subjects to enlisted men at colleges across the United States. Over 2,100 ASTP members studied at VMI during the war.

=== Post-World War II ===
The arsenal, the structure that received most of the damage when Union forces shelled and burned the institute in June 1864, was rebuilt as the Old Barracks. The new wing of the barracks ("New Barracks") was completed in 1949.

In 1997, 30 female students enrolled, marking VMI's new status as a coeducational institution.

In October 2020, VMI Board of Visitors announced that they would relocate the Jackson statue from the front of the historic barracks to the New Market Battlefield State Historical Park. It was taken from view in December 2020.

==== Racism investigation ====
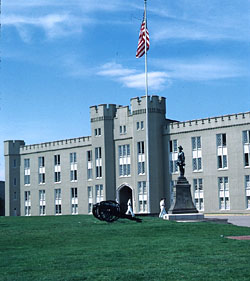
Main barracks in 2008

Virginia Military Institute was the last public college in Virginia to integrate, first admitting black cadets in 1968, but interracial problems persisted long afterward. According to The Washington Post, even in 2020 "Black cadets still endure[d] relentless racism [in an] atmosphere of hostility and cultural insensitivity".

On October 19, 2020, following the exposé, Governor Ralph Northam and multiple other state officials wrote the VMI Board of Visitors that they had "deep concerns about the clear and appalling culture of ongoing structural racism" at VMI. They reported that they had received reports from students of a racist culture at VMI. The students reported a threat of lynching, attacks on social media, and a staff member promoting "an inaccurate and dangerous 'Lost Cause' version of Virginia's history." The letter was signed by Northam, Lt. Gov. Justin Fairfax, Virginia House Speaker Eileen Filler-Corn, State Senate President Louise Lucas, Attorney General Mark Herring, and Chairman of the Black Caucus Lamont Bagby. Northam, a 1981 VMI alumnus, ordered a state-led investigation.

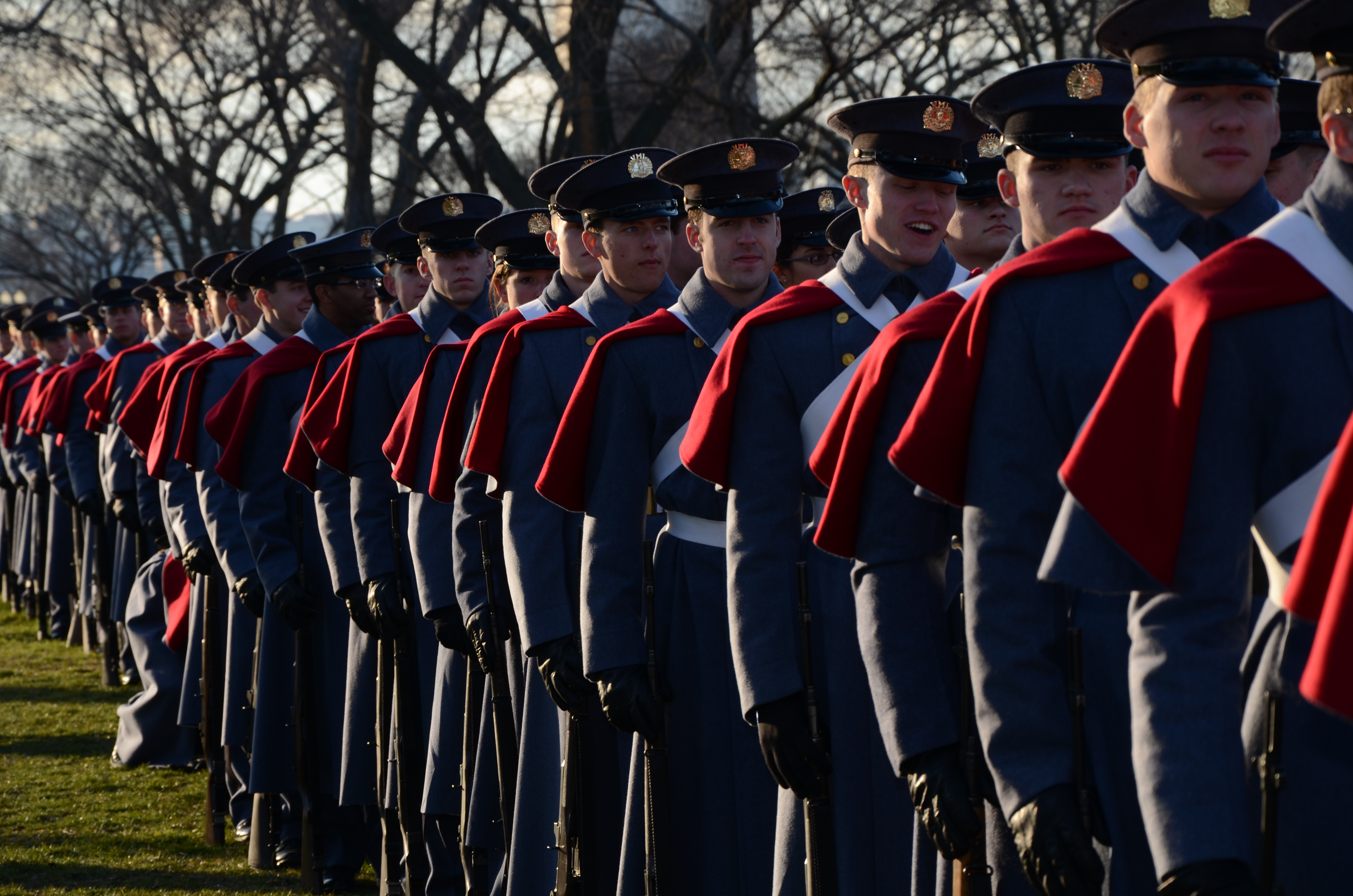
VMI Honor Guard

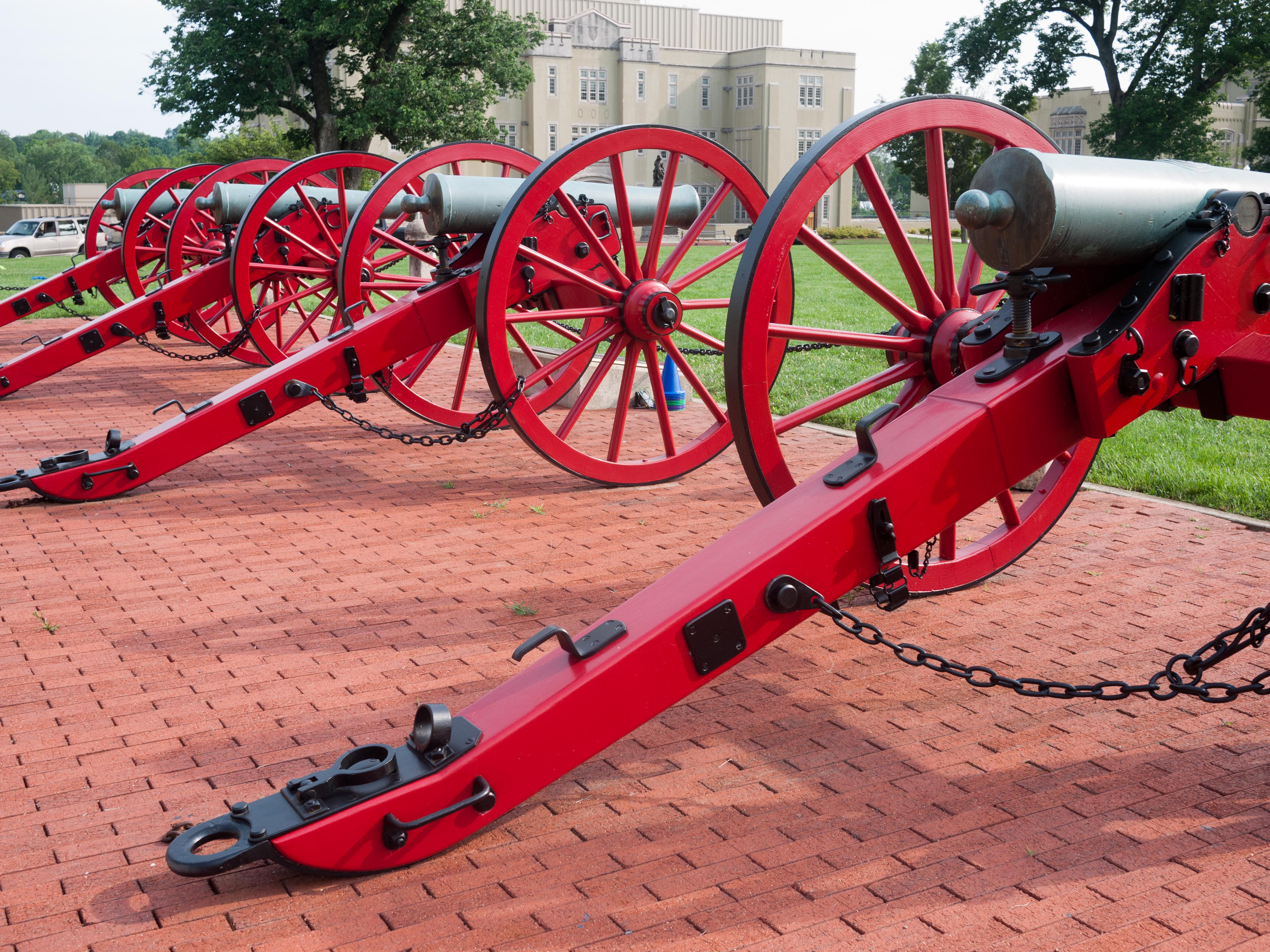
VMI cannons in front of barracks

Six days later, on October 26, 2020, Superintendent Peay tendered his resignation, saying in his resignation letter that he'd been told that Northam and other state legislators had "lost confidence in my leadership" and "desired my resignation". Three days later, the VMI Board of Visitors voted unanimously to remove the Jackson statue and create a building and naming committee. The school reaffirmed the statue's removal in December and began plans to relocated it to a Civil War museum located on a battlefield where a number of VMI cadets and alumni were killed or wounded.

In 2021, the VMI Board of Visitors appointed the first black superintendent, Cedric T. Wins, who was expected to lead diversity efforts. In October, the board also announced several diversity-related decisions: a diversity officer would be appointed, a diversity and inclusion committee would be created, and diversity initiatives created to include a focus on gender and the adoption of a diversity hiring plan. Nine months later, a report into racial intolerance charged by the State Council of Higher Education for Virginia was delivered. The independent report concluded that VMI "maintained and allowed a racist and sexist culture that, until recently, it had no appetite to address". The authors, employed by the law firm Barnes & Thornburg, also accused the institution's leadership, including its governing board, with an "unwillingness to change or even question its practices".

On February 28, 2025, the board voted not to extend Wins' contract.

=== Superintendents ===
Since 1839, VMI has had sixteen superintendents, 13 of whom were graduates of the institute.

1. Francis H. Smith (1839–1889), CSA, United States Military Academy class of 1833
2. Scott Shipp (1890–1907), CSA, VMI class of 1859, wounded while leading VMI cadets into the Battle of New Market
3. Edward W. Nichols (1907–1924), VMI class of 1878
4. William H. Cocke (1924–1929), VMI class of 1894
5. John A. Lejeune (1929–1937), USMC, United States Naval Academy class of 1888, 13th Commandant of the Marine Corps
6. Charles E. Kilbourne (1937–1946), USA, VMI class of 1894, Medal of Honor recipient and first American to earn the United States' three highest military decorations.
7. Richard J. Marshall (1946–1952), USA, VMI class of 1915
8. William H. Milton Jr. (1952–1960), VMI class of 1920
9. George R. E. Shell (1960–1971), USMC, VMI class of 1931
10. Richard L. Irby (1971–1981), VMI class of 1939
11. Sam S. Walker (1981–1988), USA, matriculated at VMI transferred to United States Military Academy West Point class of 1946
12. John W. Knapp (1989–1995), VMI class of 1954
13. Josiah Bunting III (1995–2002), USA, VMI class of 1963
14. J. H. Binford Peay III (2003–2020), USA, VMI class of 1962
15. Cedric T. Wins (2021–2025), USA, VMI class of 1985
16. David Furness (2025-present), USMC, VMI class of 1987

== Campus ==
The VMI campus covers 134 acres (54 ha), 12 of which are designated as the Virginia Military Institute Historic District, a designated National Historic Landmark District. The campus is referred to as the "Post," a tradition that reflects the school's military focus and the uniformed service of its alumni. A training area of several hundred additional acres is located near the post. All cadets are housed on campus in a large five-story building, called the "barracks." The Old Barracks, which has been separately designated a National Historic Landmark, stands on the site of the old arsenal.

The two wings surround two quadrangles connected by a sally port. All rooms open onto porch-like stoops facing one of the quadrangles. A third barracks wing was completed, with cadets moving in officially spring semester 2009. Four of the five arched entries into the barracks are named for George Washington, Thomas "Stonewall" Jackson, George C. Marshall '01 and Jonathan Daniels '61.

VMI's "Vision 2039" capital campaign raised more than $275 million from alumni and supporters in three years. The money is going to expand The Barracks to house 1,500 cadets, renovate and modernize the academic buildings. VMI is spending another $200 million to build the VMI Center for Leadership and Ethics, to be used by cadets, Washington and Lee University students, and other U.S. and international students. The funding will also support "study abroad" programs, including joint ventures with Oxford and Cambridge Universities in England and many other universities.

== Academics ==
In 2025, VMI offered 14 majors in 6 academic departments: Arts and Humanities, Engineering, Information and Social Sciences, Life Sciences, Natural Sciences, and ROTC. The institute was ranked 65 in the 2025 U.S. News & World Report rankings of "National Liberal Arts Colleges".

== Military service ==
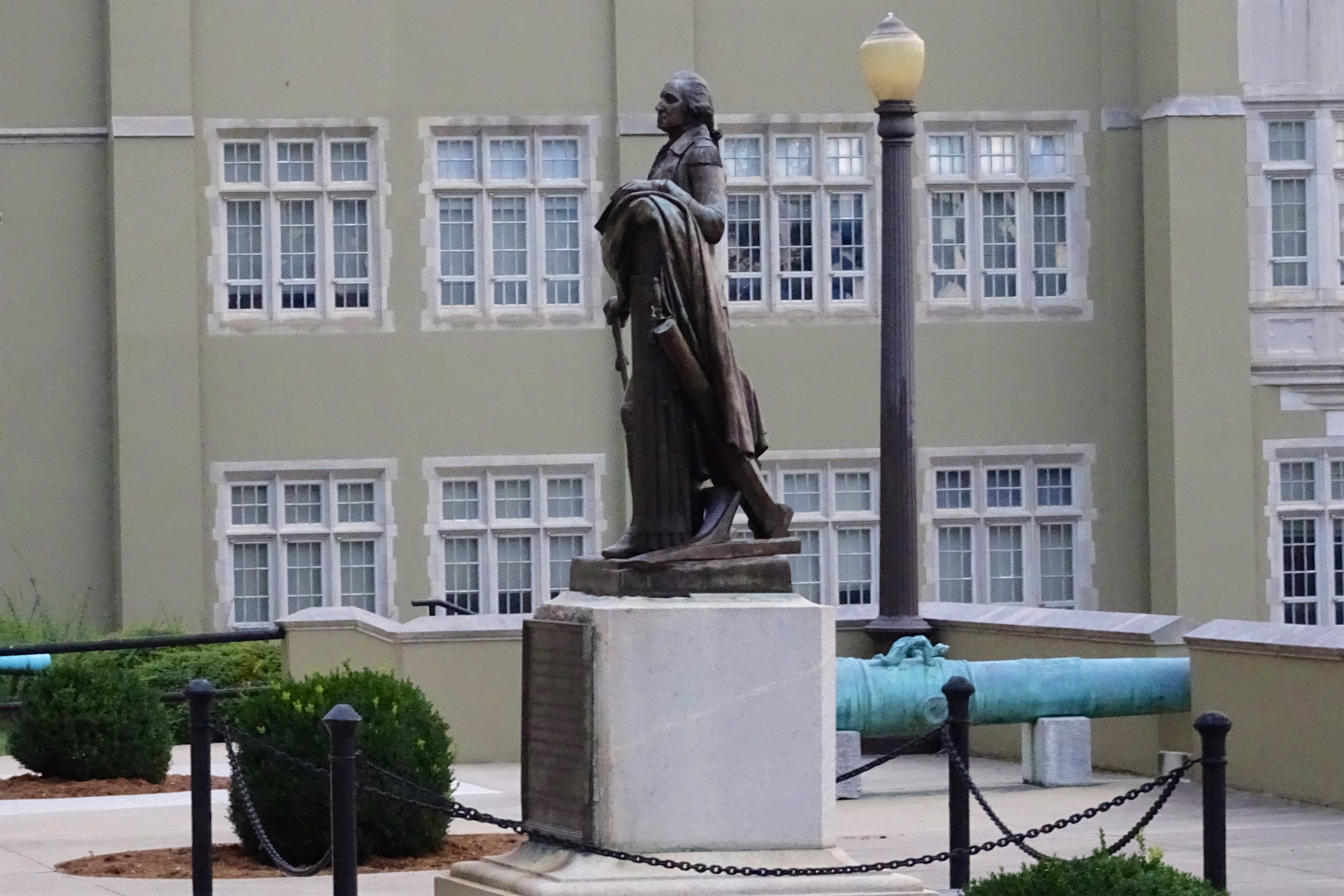
George Washington statue

Cadets are required to take two years of ROTC, but accepting a commission in the armed forces is optional. While over 50 percent of VMI graduates are commissioned each year, the VMI Board of Visitors has set a goal of having 70 percent of VMI cadets take a commission. The VMI class of 2017 graduated 300 cadets, 172 (or 57 percent) of whom were commissioned as officers in the United States military.

VMI alumni include more than 285 general and flag officers, including the first five-star General of the Army, George Marshall; seven recipients of the highest U.S. military decoration, the Medal of Honor; and more than 80 recipients of the second-highest awards, the Distinguished Service Cross and Navy Cross. VMI offers ROTC programs for five U.S. military branches (Army, Navy, Marine Corps, Air Force, Space Force.) As the Coast Guard does not have an ROTC, VMI participates in the Coast Guard Auxiliary University Program which provides a pathway for cadets to commission into the Coast Guard upon graduation.

VMI has graduated more generals than any ROTC program in the United States. The following table lists U.S. four-star generals who graduated from VMI. It does not list alumni who did not graduate from the school, such as General George S. Patton and General Sam S. Walker, and the many VMI graduates who served or still serve as four-star generals in foreign nations such as Thailand, China, and Taiwan.

Name	VMI class	Branch & date of rank	Notes
George Marshall	1901	Army, September 1, 1939	First General of the Army (five stars), 10th four-star general in U.S. Army history & 1st non-USMA four-star general; Chief of Staff, U.S. Army, 1939–45; Secretary of State, 1947–49; Secretary of Defense, 1950–51; Special Representative of President to China, 1945–47; President of the American Red Cross, 1949–50; Nobel Peace Prize, 1953; Congressional Gold Medal, 1946
Thomas T. Handy	1916	Army, March 13, 1945	22nd four-star general in U.S. Army history; Deputy Chief of Staff, U.S. Army, 1944–47; Commanding General, Fourth Army, 1947–49; Commander-in-Chief, European Command (1949–52) & USAREUR/Commander, CENTAG (1952); Deputy Commander-in-Chief, EUCOM 1952–54
Lemuel C. Shepherd, Jr.	1917	USMC, January 1, 1952	3rd four-star general in USMC history; Commandant, U.S. Marine Corps, 1952–55; Chairman, Inter-American Defense Board, 1956–59
Leonard T. Gerow	1911	Army, July 19, 1954	Commanding General V Corps 1943–45; Commanding General U.S. 15th Army, 1945–46.
Randolph M. Pate	1921	USMC, January 1, 1956	4th four-star general in USMC history; Commandant of the Marine Corps, 1956–59
Clark L. Ruffner	1924	Army, March 1, 1960	51st four-star General in U.S. Army history; U.S. Military Representative, NATO Military Committee, 1960–62
David M. Maddox	1960	Army, July 9, 1992	149th four-star general in U.S. Army history; Commander-in-Chief, USAREUR/Commander, CENTAG (1992–93) & USAREUR (1993–94)
J. H. Binford Peay III	1962	Army, March 26, 1993	150th four-star general in Army history; Vice Chief of Staff, U.S. Army, 1993–94; Commander-in-Chief, Central Command, 1994–97; Superintendent, VMI, 2003–2020
John P. Jumper	1966	Air Force, November 17, 1997	152nd four-star general in U.S. Air Force history; Commander in Chief, USAFE/Commander, AAFCE, 1997–2000; Commander, Air Combat Command, 2000–01; Chief of Staff, U.S. Air Force, 2001–05
Darren W. McDew	1982	Air Force, May 5, 2014	200th four-star general in U.S. Air Force history; Commander, Air Mobility Command (COMAMC), 2014–2015; Commander, United States Transportation Command (TRANSCOM), 2015–2018
Dan Caine	1990	Air Force, July 1, 2025	211th four-star general in U.S. Air Force history; Chairman, Joint Chiefs of Staff, 2025–present

== Students ==
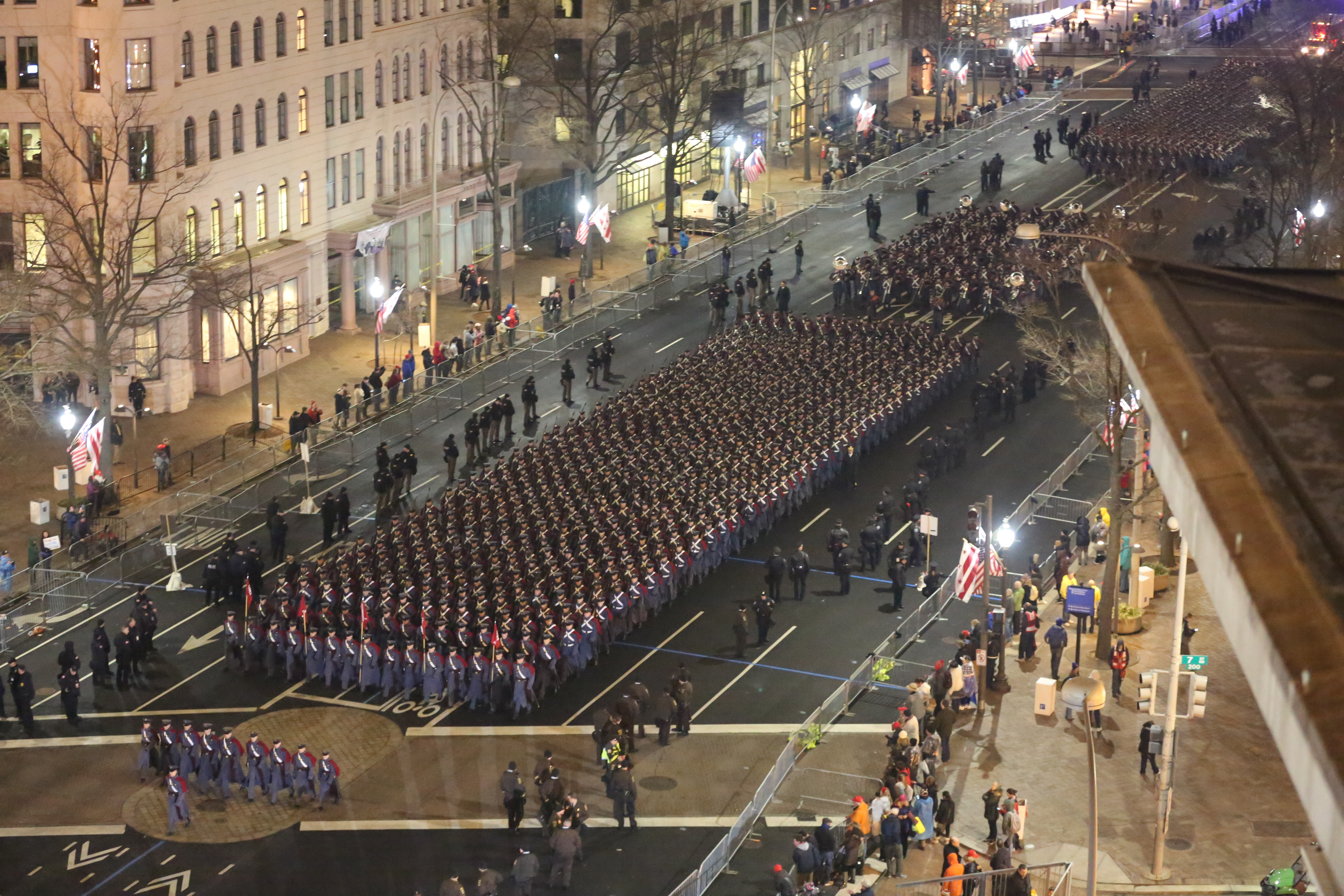
Members of the Corps of Cadets march down Pennsylvania Avenue in January 2017, after the inauguration of Donald Trump.

Undergraduate demographics as of Fall 2023
Race and ethnicity	Total
White	72%
Hispanic	9%
Black	7%
Asian	5%
Two or more races	4%
International student	2%
Native Hawaiian/Pacific Islander	1%
Economic diversity
Low-income (Note: The percentage of students who received an income-based federal Pell grant intended for low-income students.)	16%
Affluent (Note: The percentage of students who are a part of the American middle class at the bare minimum.)	84%

Prospective cadets must be between 16 and 22 years of age. They must be unmarried, and have no legal dependents, be physically fit for enrollment in the Reserve Officer Training Corps (ROTC), and be graduates of an accredited secondary school or have completed an approved homeschool curriculum. The Class of 2022 at VMI had an average high school GPA of 3.70 and a mean SAT score of 1210.

Eligibility is not restricted to Virginia residents, although it is more difficult to gain an appointment as a non-resident, because VMI has a goal that no more than 45 percent of cadets come from outside Virginia. Virginia residents receive a discount in tuition, as is common at most state-sponsored schools. Total tuition, room and board, and other fees for the 2008–2009 school year was approximately $17,000 for Virginia residents and $34,000 for all others.

=== Admission of women ===
In 1990 the U.S. Department of Justice filed a discrimination lawsuit against VMI for its all-male admissions policy. While the court challenge was pending, a state-sponsored Virginia Women's Institute for Leadership (VWIL) was opened at Mary Baldwin College in Staunton, Virginia, as a parallel program for women. The VWIL continued, even after VMI's admission of women.

After VMI won its case in U.S. District Court, the case went through several appeals until June 26, 1996, when the U.S. Supreme Court, in a 7–1 decision in United States v. Virginia, found that it was unconstitutional for a school supported by public funds to exclude women. (Justice Clarence Thomas recused himself, presumably because his son was attending VMI at the time.) Following the ruling, VMI contemplated going private to exempt itself from the 14th Amendment, and thus avoid the ruling.

Assistant Secretary of Defense Frederick Pang, however, warned the school that the Department of Defense would withdraw ROTC programs from the school if privatization took place. As a result of this action by Pang, Congress passed a resolution on November 18, 1997, prohibiting the Department of Defense from withdrawing or diminishing any ROTC program at one of the six senior military colleges, including VMI. This escape clause provided by Congress came after the VMI Board of Visitors had already voted 9–8 to admit women; the decision was not revisited. VMI thereby reluctantly became the last U.S. military college to admit women. Superintendent at the time Josiah Bunting III called this a "savage disappointment".

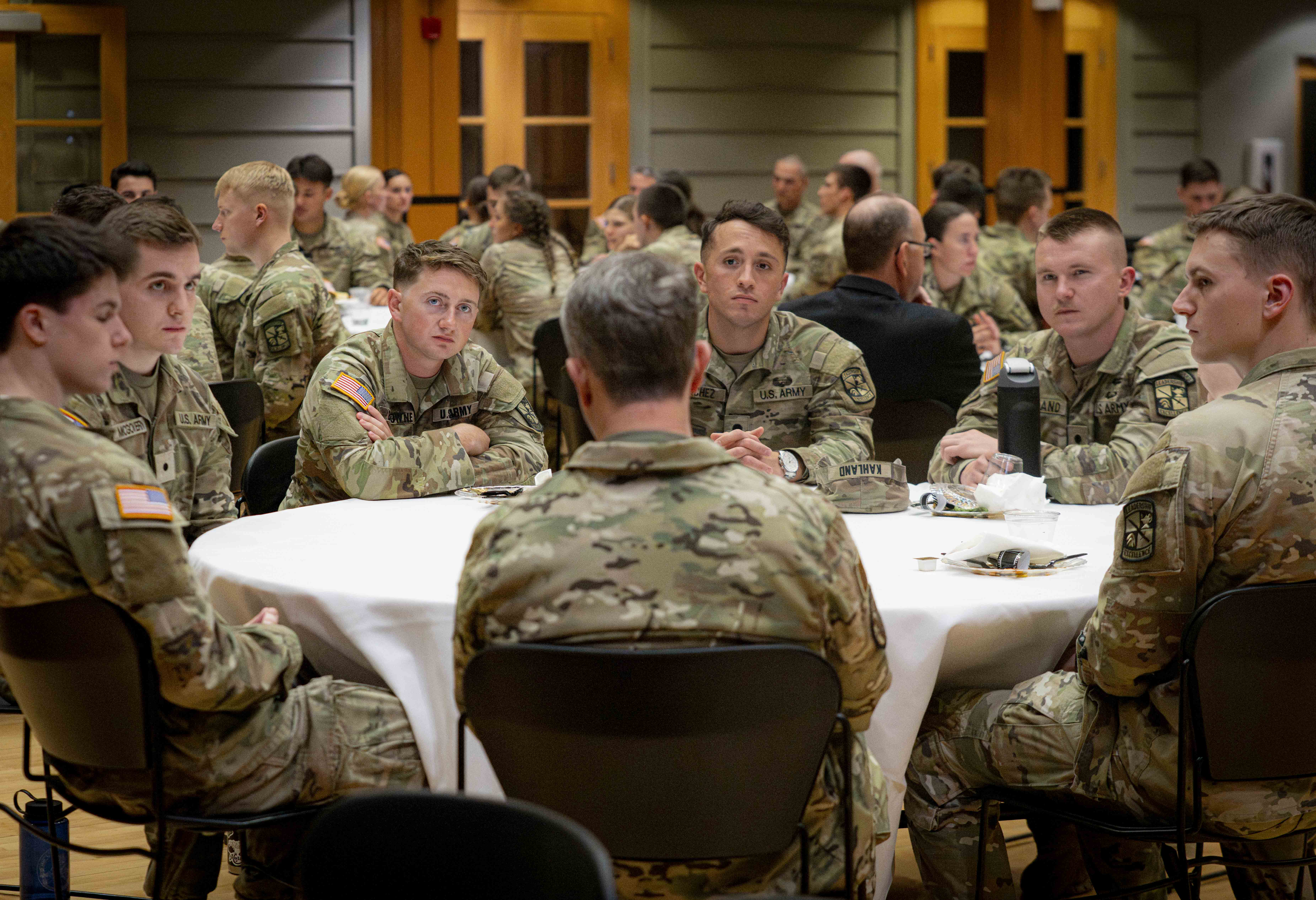
Top Army ROTC cadets, including female students, attend the 51st annual George C. Marshall Leadership and Awards Seminar at the VMI, February 23, 2026

In August 1997, VMI enrolled its first female cadets. The first co-ed class consisted of thirty women, who matriculated as part of the class of 2001. In order to accelerate VMI's matriculation process, several women were allowed to transfer directly from various junior colleges, such as New Mexico Military Institute (NMMI), and forgo the traditional four-year curriculum required of most. The first female cadets "walked the stage" in 1999 for graduation, although by VMI's definitions they are considered to be members of the class of 2001. Initially, these 30 women were held to the same strict physical courses and technical training as the male cadets, and even were required to shave their heads. In a July 2021 Washington Post article, it was alleged that derision, misogyny, sexual assault were continuous issues at VMI.

=== Admission of minority students ===
The first Jewish cadet, Moses Jacob Ezekiel, graduated in 1866. While at VMI, Ezekiel fought with the VMI cadets at the Battle of New Market. He became a sculptor and his works are on display at VMI. One of the first Asian cadets was Sun Li-jen, the Chinese National Revolutionary Army general, who graduated in 1927. The first African-American cadets were admitted in 1968. The first African-American regimental commander was Darren McDew, class of 1982. McDew is a retired U.S. Air Force General and former Commander, United States Transportation Command, Scott Air Force Base, IL. It is unknown when the first Muslim cadet graduated from VMI, but before the Iranian Revolution of 1979, under Shah Mohammad Reza Pahlavi, several Persian cadets attended and graduated from VMI. Other Muslim graduates have included cadets from Bangladesh, Jordan, Indonesia, Somalia and other nations. In 1982, Son (Sean) Minh Le became the first post-1975 Vietnamese refugee to graduate.

=== Student life ===
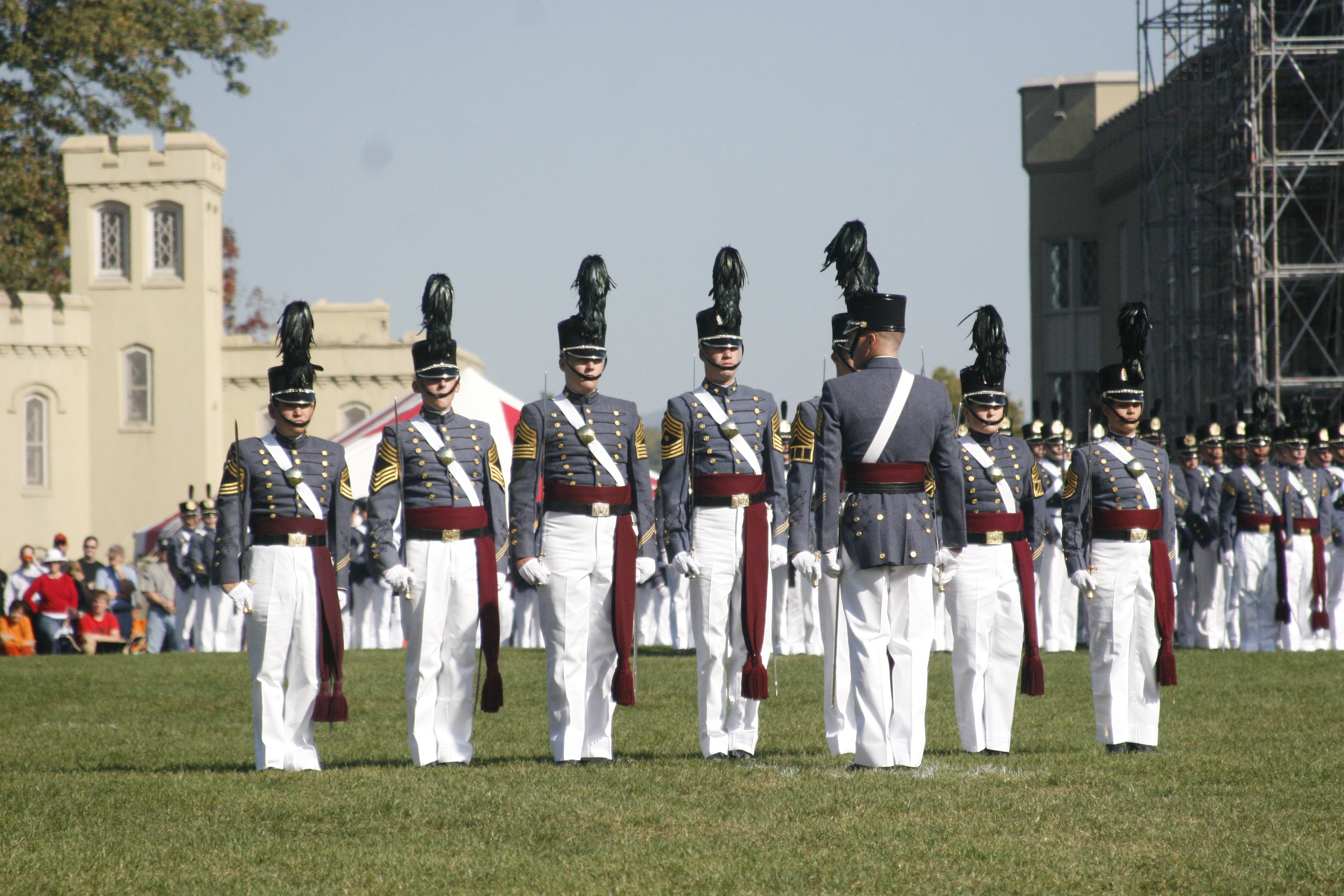
The Regimental Commander gives commands to the Corps of Cadets during a parade in coatee.

Just as cadets did nearly 200 years ago, today's cadets give up such comforts as beds, instead lying upon cots colloquially referred to as "hays". These hays are little more than foam mats that must be rolled every morning and aired every Monday. Further, cadet uniforms have changed little; the coatee worn in parades dates to the War of 1812. New cadets, known as "Rats", are not permitted to watch TV or listen to music outside of an academic setting. Living conditions are considered more austere here than other senior military colleges.

=== Ratline ===
During the first six months at VMI, new cadets are called "Rats", a term used since the 1850s. "Rats" refer to their classmates, male or female, as "Brother Rats". VMI folklore has it that when Washington College (now Washington and Lee University) students and VMI cadets drilled together in the 1830s, the students called the cadets "Rats" perhaps because of their gray uniforms. The cadets responded in kind calling the neighboring students "Minks" perhaps because many of them were from wealthy backgrounds.

New cadets, known collectively as the "Rat Mass," walk along a prescribed line in barracks while maintaining an exaggerated form of attention, called "straining". This experience, called the Rat Line, is intended by the upper classes to instill camaraderie, pride, and discipline into the incoming class. Under this system, the Rats face numerous mental and physical challenges, starting with "Hell Week". During Hell Week, Rats receive basic military instruction from select upper classmen ("Cadre"); they learn to march, to clean their M14 rifle, and to wear their uniforms. During Hell Week, Rats also meet the members of various cadet-run organizations and learn the functions of each.

At the end of the first week, each Rat is paired with a first classman (senior) who serves as their mentor for the rest of the first year. The first classman is called a "Dyke", referencing an older Southern pronunciation of "to deck out", or to get into a uniform, as one of the roles of the rat is to help prepare their "Dyke's" uniform and dress them for parades.

The Ratline experience culminates with Resurrection Week ending in "Breakout", an event where the Rats are formally "welcomed" to the VMI community. After the successful completion of Breakout, Rats are officially fourth class students and no longer have to strain in the barracks or eat "square meals". Many versions of the Breakout ceremony have been conducted. In the 1950s, Rats from each company would be packed into a corner room in the barracks and brawl their way out through the upperclassmen. From the late 1960s through the early 1980s, the Rats had to fight their way up to the fourth level of the barracks through three other classes of cadets determined not to let them get to the top. The stoops would often be slick with motor oil, packed with snow, glazed with ice, greased, or continuously hosed with water. The barracks stairs and rails were not able to take the abuse, so the Corps moved the breakout to a muddy hill, where Rats attempt to climb to the top by crawling on their stomachs while the upper classes block them or drag them back down. The Rats no longer breakout in the mud but instead participate in a grueling day of physical activity testing both physical endurance and teamwork.

The entire body of Rats during the Ratline is called a "Rat Mass". Since Rats are not officially fourth classmen until after Breakout, the Rat Mass is also not officially considered a graduating class until that time either. Prior to Breakout, the Rat mass is given a different style of year identifier to emphasize this difference. The year identifier starts with the year of the current graduating class (their dykes' class), followed by a "+3" to indicate the anticipated year of their own class. For example, cadets that make up the Class of 2022 were considered the "Rat Mass of 2019+3" as the members of their dykes' class graduated in 2019 and they themselves will graduate three years onward from then.

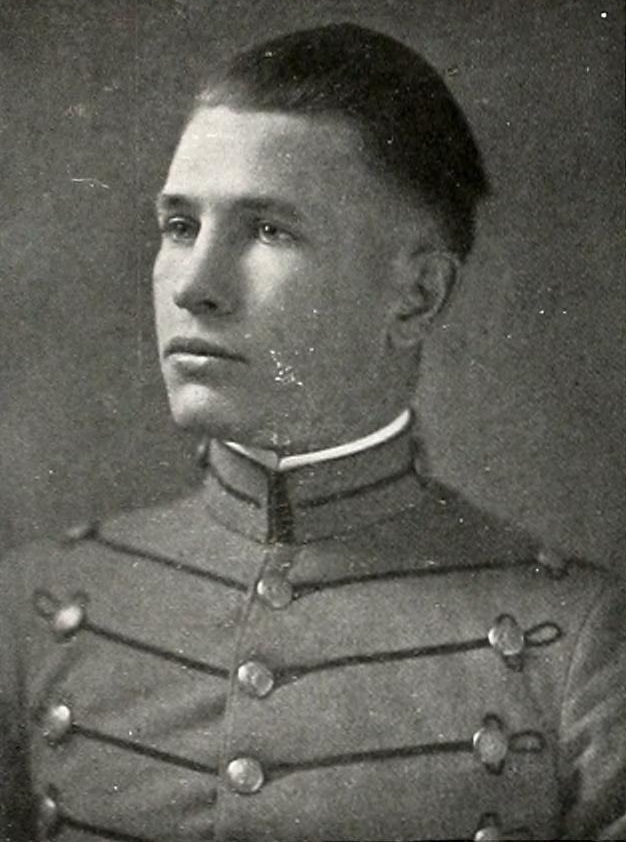
Cadet in uniform, 1914

=== Traditions ===
In addition to the Ratline, VMI has other traditions that are emblematic of the school and its history including the new cadet oath ceremony, the pageantry of close-order marching, and the nightly playing of "Taps". An event second only to graduation in importance is the "Ring Figure" dance held every November. During their junior year, cadets receive class rings at a ring presentation ceremony followed by a formal dance. Most cadets get two rings, a formal ring and a combat ring; some choose to have the combat ring for everyday wear, and the formal for special occasions.

Every year, VMI honors its fallen cadets with a New Market Day parade and ceremony. These events take place on May 15, the same day as the Battle of New Market in which VMI cadets fought in 1864 during the Civil War. During this ceremony, the roll is called for cadets who "died on the Field of Honor" and wreaths are placed on the graves of those who died during the Battle of New Market. Since 2021, this ceremony has expanded to also include VMI graduates who have died in service to the United States.

The requirement that all cadets wishing to eat dinner in the mess hall must be present for a prayer was the basis for a lawsuit in 2002 when two cadets sued VMI over the prayer said before dinner. The non-denominational prayer had been a daily fixture since the 1950s. In 2002 the Fourth Circuit ruled the prayer, during an event with mandatory attendance, at a state-funded school, violated the U.S. Constitution. When the Supreme Court declined to review the school's appeal in April 2004, the prayer tradition was stopped.

The tradition of guarding the institute is one of the longest standing and is carried out to this day. Cadets have been posted as sentinels guarding the barracks 24 hours a day, seven days a week while school is in session since the first cadet sentinel, Cadet John B. Strange, and others relieved the Virginia Militia guard team tasked with defending the Lexington Arsenal (that later became VMI) in 1839. The guard team wears the traditional school uniform and each sentinel is armed with an M14 rifle and bayonet.

=== Honor code ===
VMI is known for its strict honor code, which is as old as the institute and was formally codified in the early 20th century. Under the VMI Honor Code, "a cadet will not lie, cheat, steal, nor tolerate those who do." The only one punishment for violating the VMI Honor Code is immediate expulsion in the form of a drumming out ceremony, in which the entire corps is awakened by drums in barracks and the honor court to hear the formal announcement of dismissal. VMI is the only military college or academy in the nation which maintains a single-sanction honor code. In recent times, the dismissed cadet has left campus before the formal announcement is made.

=== Clubs and activities ===
VMI currently offers over 50 school-sponsored clubs and organizations, including The Cadet, recreational activities, military organizations, musical and performance groups, religious organizations and service groups. Although VMI prohibited cadet membership in fraternal organizations starting in 1885, VMI cadets were instrumental in starting several fraternities. Alpha Tau Omega fraternity was founded by VMI cadets Otis Allan Glazebrook, Alfred Marshall, and Erskine Mayo Ross at Richmond, Virginia on September 11, 1865, while the school was closed for reconstruction.

After the re-opening, Kappa Sigma Kappa fraternity was founded by cadets on September 28, 1867, and Sigma Nu fraternity was founded by cadets on January 1, 1869. VMI cadets formed the second chapter of the Kappa Alpha Order. In a special arrangement, graduating cadets may be nominated by Kappa Alpha Order alumni and inducted into the fraternity, becoming part of Kappa Alpha Order's Beta Commission (a commission as opposed to an active chapter). This occurs following graduation, and the newly initiated VMI alumni are accepted as brothers of the fraternity.

== Athletics ==
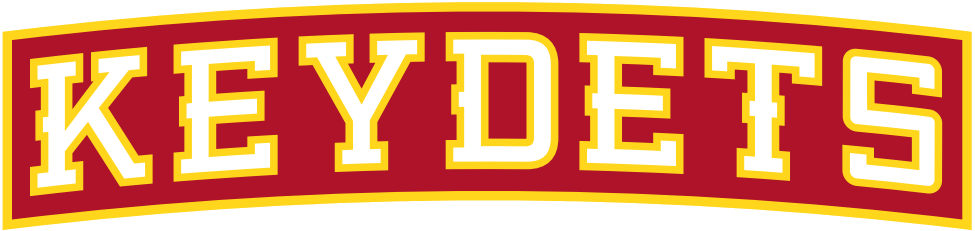
VMI athletics wordmark

VMI fields 14 teams on the NCAA Division I level (FCS, formerly I-AA, for football). Varsity sports include baseball, basketball, men's and women's cross country, football, lacrosse, men's and women's rifle, men's and women's soccer, men's and women's swimming & diving, men's and women's track & field, and wrestling. VMI is a member of the Southern Conference (SoCon) for almost all sports, the MAAC for women's water polo, and the America East Conference for men's and women's swimming & diving. VMI formerly was a member of the Mid-Atlantic Rifle Conference for rifle, but began the 2016–2017 season as part of the Southern Conference. The VMI team name is the Keydets, a Southern style slang for the word "cadets".

VMI has the second-smallest NCAA Division I enrollment of any FCS football college, after Presbyterian College. Approximately one-third of the Corps of Cadets plays on at least one of VMI's intercollegiate athletic teams, making it one of the most active athletic programs in the country. Of the VMI varsity athletes who complete their eligibility, 92 percent receive their VMI degrees.

=== Football ===
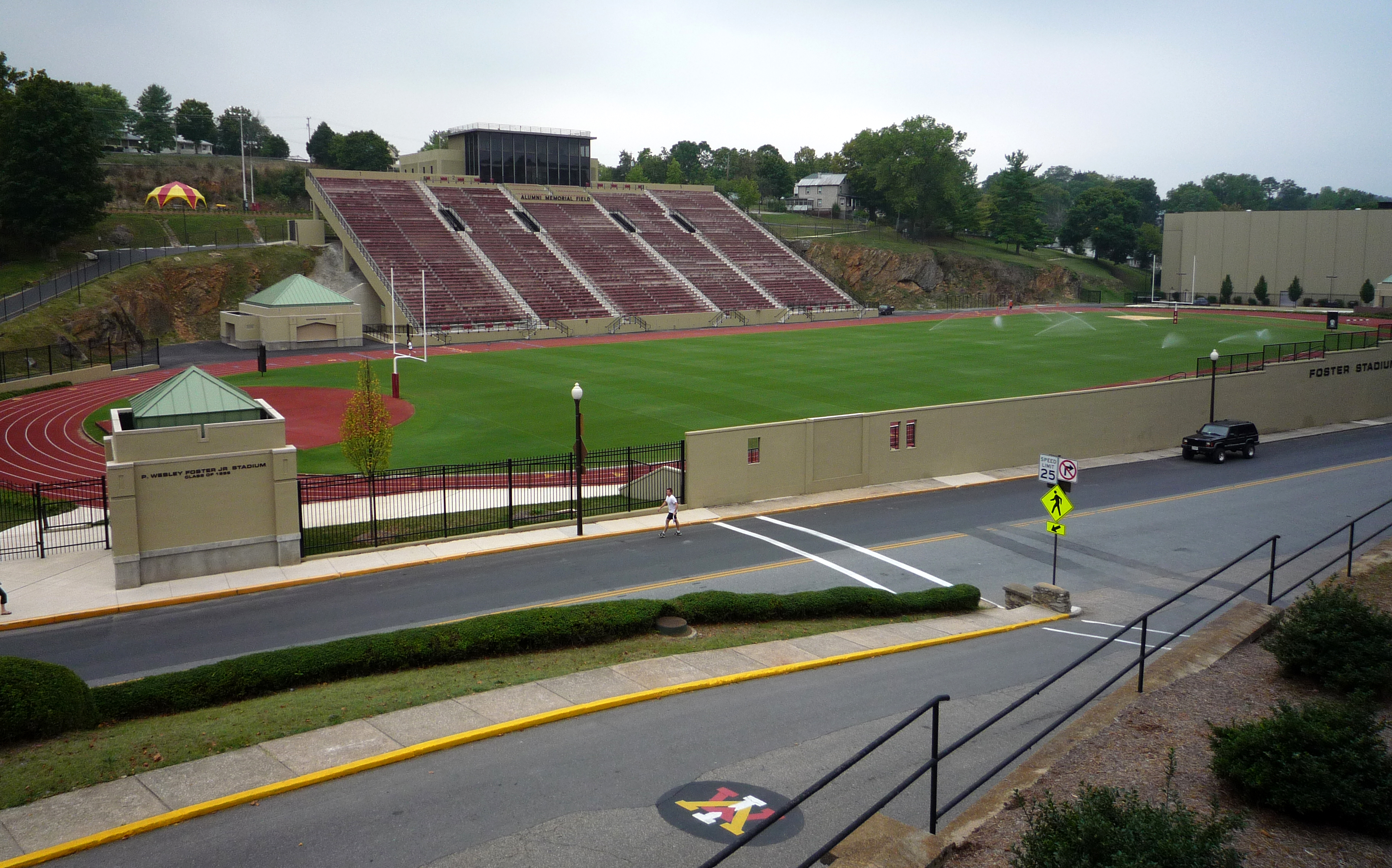
Alumni Memorial Field at Foster Stadium

VMI played its first football game in 1871. The one-game season was a 4–2 loss to Washington and Lee University. There are no records of a coach or any players for that game. VMI waited another twenty years, until 1891, when head coach Walter Taylor would coach the next football team. The current head football coach at VMI, Scott Wachenheim, was named the 31st head coach on December 14, 2014. The Keydets play their home games out of Alumni Memorial Field at Foster Stadium, built in 1962. VMI won the 2020 Southern Conference Football Championship, their first winning football season since 1981.

=== Men's basketball ===
Perhaps the most famous athletic story in VMI history was the two-year run of the 1976 and 1977 basketball teams. The 1976 squad advanced within one game of the Final Four before bowing to undefeated Rutgers in the East Regional Final, and in 1977 VMI finished with 26 wins and just four losses, still a school record, and reached the "Sweet 16" round of the NCAA tournament.

The VMI basketball team has been led by head coach Andrew Wilson since April 11, 2022.

== Alumni ==
VMI's alumni include: former governors of Virginia (Ralph Northam, Westmoreland Davis); the 25th secretary of the Army (Ryan D. McCarthy); a five-star general, secretary of state, secretary of defense, and Nobel Peace Prize recipient (George C. Marshall); Pulitzer Prize winners, 13 Rhodes Scholars, Medal of Honor recipients, an Academy Award winner, an Emmy Award and Golden Globe winner, a martyr recognized by the Episcopal Church, senators and representatives, governors, lieutenant governors, a Supreme Court justice, numerous college and university presidents, many business leaders (presidents and CEOs) and over 285 general and flag officers, including service chiefs for three of the four armed services.

Two recent chiefs of engineers of the Army Corps of Engineers, Lieutenant Generals Carl A. Strock and Robert B. Flowers, as well as Acting Chief of Engineers Major General "Bo" Temple, were VMI Civil Engineering graduates.

== Endowment ==
A 2007 study by the National Association of College and University Business Officers found that VMI's $343 million endowment was the largest per-student endowment of any U.S. public college in the United States. 35.4 percent of the approximately 12,300 living alumni gave in 2006. Private support covers more than 31 percent of VMI's operating budget; state funds, 26 percent.

== In popular culture ==
- Ronald Reagan starred in the films Brother Rat and Brother Rat and a Baby, which were filmed at VMI. Originally a Broadway hit, the play was written by John Monks Jr. and Fred F. Finklehoffe, both 1932 graduates of VMI.
- Both the novel and film Gods and Generals depict Stonewall Jackson teaching at VMI before Virginia secedes. The film also depicts Jackson's funeral at VMI.
- In 2014, the film Field of Lost Shoes premiered in Richmond to the Corps of Cadets and the cast. The film depicts the Battle of New Market in 1864. VMI now owns and operates this historical battlefield museum and site.
- The VMI marching song is referenced and in part performed in the documentary Grey Gardens.

== See also ==
- Virginia Defense Force
- Virginia National Guard
