= The Cadet (newspaper) =

Newspaper in Lexington, Virginia

- The front page of The Cadet for Friday, 17 February 1967.
- Type: Student newspaper
- Format: Broadsheet, Online Publication
- Owner: The Cadet Foundation, Inc.
- Publisher: The Cadet Foundation, Inc., The Lexington News-Gazette
- Editor: James Mansfield '22; Joseph Malazo '22; Peyton Wiecking '23; Claire Curtis '23; Patrick Sexton '24
- Staff writers: Lancelot Wiemann '22; Emily Liska '22; Dennison Kelly '23; William Franklin '23; Andrew Weston '24; Russell Crouch '24; Noah McHugh '24; Alex Warr '24; Kyle Dargis ’24
- Founded: VMI Cadet Magazine 1871-1891; The Keydet 1907-1934; The VMI Cadet 1934-1994; The Cadet 1994-2016, 2021-Present
- Headquarters: Virginia Military Institute, Lexington, Virginia
- Circulation: > 1,500
- Website: cadetnewspaper.com

The Cadet (also called The Keydet from 1907 to 1934 and The VMI Cadet from 1934 to 1994) is a bi-weekly student newspaper published by Virginia Military Institute Cadets. In May 2021, The Cadet was restarted by cadets who wanted a newspaper to coincide with their graduation ceremony. Since then, the cadet has been staffed by current VMI cadets, and is financially supported by donations. On October 29, 2021, The Cadet announced that it was a recognized IRS 501(c)(3). This was done to ensure that members of The Cadet staff maintain independence from VMI's Office of Communications and Marketing in order to afford The Cadet's Staff complete editorial control. In October 2021, The Cadet was accepted into the Virginia Press Association (VPA) and the cadets who operate the newspaper all carry Virginia State Police Press IDs. The Cadet is owned by The Cadet Foundation, INC and is published with the assistance of the Lexington News-Gazette.

According to Henry A. Wise’s definitive history of VMI, Drawing Out the Man: The VMI Story, The Cadet began as a monthly magazine from 1871 to 1873 after which publication was paused and was revived briefly in 1890 – 1891. From its start in the first known edition of March 1871, the focus of The Cadet has been on the life of the cadets as students. In comparing the publication and its student readership to other colleges, the original editors wrote: “So cadet-life is student-life, but our experience and our traditions are racy with their own particular flavor.” The Cadet also serves a critical purpose in chronicling the VMI experience of cadets and alumni. The Cadet transformed to a newspaper format with the first known initial newspaper format publication in 1907.

From the start, The Cadet was thought-provoking and inspired open dialogue on issues of controversy. This began with the name for the newspaper itself know, for a very few of its first issues in October 1907 as The Keydet. VMI officially recognizes and accepts the term “Keydet” as synonymous with “Cadet.” The Cadet and The Keydet are, therefore the same entity. The Cadet has always been independently run by the VMI Corps of Cadets since its first issue. The current version of The Cadet commenced publication in May 2021 and has been publishing editions on a bi-weekly basis during the Fall and Spring semesters. The Cadet had an original subscription price for the magazine of $1.50 per annum, postpaid. It was not produced for three years during World War II and between 2016 and 2021. There was a project underway to digitize every issue of The Cadet from the earliest known issue from 1907 and it was scheduled to be completed in 2011. The VMI Archives, operating out of VMI's Preston Library, now have a digitized copy of each issue published since 1907. The VMI Archives Catalog now contains detailed descriptive information about manuscripts (letters, diaries, and other personal papers), historical institutional records, and other primary source research collections. Current editions of The Cadet are donated to the VMI Archives as they are published so they can be recorded in the Archives Catalog

The Cadet stopped publishing in 2016 due to a lack of student interest caused by VMI administration's increased involvement with the editing and publication process. At the time, it was one of the oldest independent college newspapers in Virginia and the United States. In the newspaper format, The Cadet was known by several different names. However, all versions of the publication were founded and operated on the foundational principle under the First Amendment as a publication independent of the Virginia Military Institute. The original newspaper was run entirely by Cadets who have complete editorial control over its contents. VMI Alumni can assist as mentors for the writers and editors to enhance and enable the journalistic experience. Currently, The Cadet has two alumni mentors who provide financial support, connections and contacts, and editing software. The Cadet was designated a public forum for cadet editors with contributions from the VMI Corps of Cadets, faculty, staff, and alumni mentors with the intent to inform and educate their readers as well as to discuss issues of concern to their audience true to the vision of its creators. The March 1871 version of The Cadet stated: "“Let The Cadet be the printed reflex of the men who support it. Let it subserve the living interests of the corps of cadets.” The Cadet's principles were re-enforced in an 1892 edition stating: "“We believe the cadets and alumni should support alone a magazine published ostensibly in their interests.”

Regular sections of the paper include a News, Opinion, Features & Special Reports, Sports, Humor & Satire, VMI History (also called the "Old Corps"), and Alumni News. Editorials typically focus on U.S. and Virginia politics as well as issues relating to or concerning the VMI Corps of Cadets. The sports section always covers VMI club, intramural, and NCAA sports and occasionally covers professional sports, Southern Conference Athletics, and Rockbridge County area sports. Special editions of The Cadet typically include an Event Page that covers annual and special events at VMI including Ring Figure, Matriculation Day, and Graduation. The Humor & Satire section is featured on the back of the last page of every publication and is made up of content exclusively submitted by members of the VMI Corps of Cadets.

== See also ==
- Virginia Military Institute
- List of college and university student newspapers in the United States
