= Virginia Military Institute Historic District =

Historic district in Virginia, United States

- U.S. National Register of Historic Places
- U.S. National Historic Landmark District
- Virginia Landmarks Register
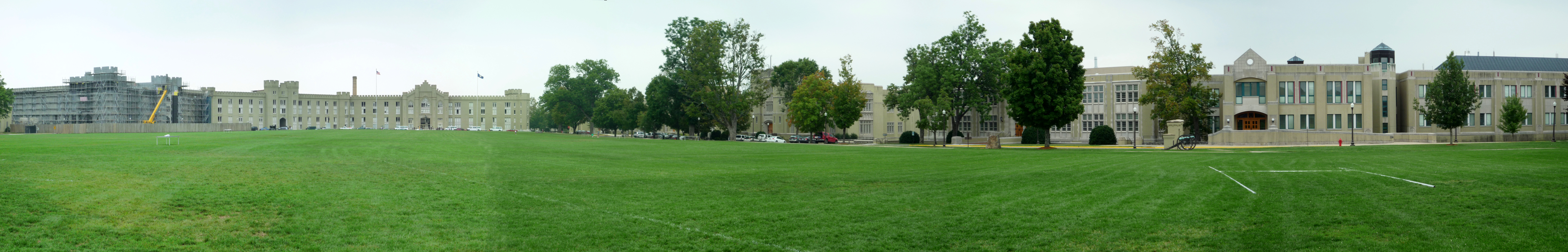
- View of parade ground, Barracks, and adjacent buildings

- Location within Virginia Location within the United States
- Location: VMI campus, Lexington, Virginia
- Coordinates: 37°47′25″N 79°26′09″W
- Area: 12 acres (4.9 ha)
- Built: 1818
- Architect: A.J. Davis; Bertram Grosvenor Goodhue
- Architectural style: Classical Revival, Gothic Revival
- NRHP reference No.: 74002219
- VLR No.: 117-0017

Significant dates
- Added to NRHP: May 30, 1974
- Designated NHLD: May 30, 1974
- Designated VLR: September 9, 1969

The Virginia Military Institute Historic District is a 12-acre (4.9 ha) National Historic Landmark District encompassing the historic central core of the Virginia Military Institute campus in Lexington, Virginia. Developed beginning in 1839, the school grew into the premiere military academy in the Southern United States, providing trained military leaders to many of the nation's wars. The district includes the Barracks, which was separately declared a National Historic Landmark in 1965. The historic district was designated in 1974.

== Description and history ==
The historic district includes the VMI campus's central parade ground, a roughly oval greensward that is ringed by campus roads with buildings on the other side. It includes all of those buildings, as well as those lining an eastward-extending tongue on Letcher Avenue, Burma Road, and Stono Lane. The dominant feature of the campus is the Barracks, a sprawling Gothic building with fortress-like crenellations. Its oldest surviving portion dates to 1848, and was designed by Alexander Jackson Davis; it is the only structure to survive Union attacks during the American Civil War, and was a major influence in the design of later buildings.

Buildings that were influenced by Davis's work include the main Commandant's Quarters, built in 1862, and the Pendleton-Coles House, also Gothic in character but in the Carpenter Gothic style. Later architectural styles on the campus include neocolonial faculty residence buildings on the west side of the parade ground. Near its eastern end, the district includes Stono, the 1818 house of John Jordan, the lead builder of the VMI campus and Centre Hall on the adjacent Washington and Lee University campus.

== See also ==
- List of National Historic Landmarks in Virginia
- National Register of Historic Places listings in Lexington, Virginia
