= Barracks, Virginia Military Institute =

Historic building in Virginia, US

- U.S. National Register of Historic Places
- U.S. National Historic Landmark
- U.S. National Historic Landmark District – Contributing property
- Virginia Landmarks Register
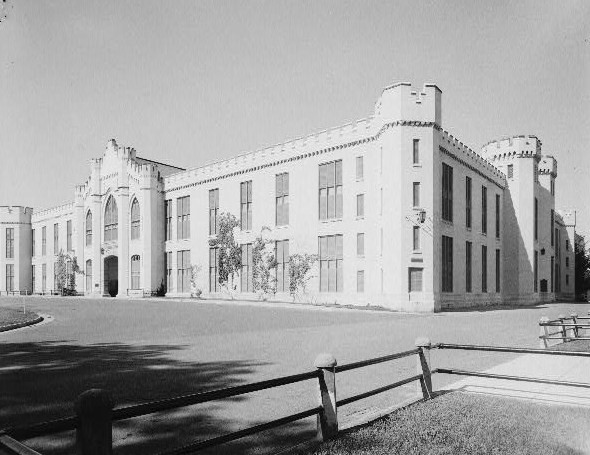
- Barracks at Virginia Military Institute

- Location within Virginia Location within the United States
- Location: N edge of Lexington on U.S. 11, Lexington, Virginia
- Coordinates: 37°47′27″N 79°26′08″W
- Built: 1848
- Architect: Alexander Jackson Davis
- Architectural style: Gothic Revival
- Part of: Virginia Military Institute Historic District (ID74002219)
- NRHP reference No.: 66000956
- VLR No.: 117-0007

Significant dates
- Added to NRHP: October 15, 1966
- Designated NHL: December 21, 1965
- Designated NHLDCP: May 30, 1974
- Designated VLR: September 9, 1969

The Old Barracks is a historic building on the campus of the Virginia Military Institute in Lexington, Virginia. Built in 1848 and repeatedly enlarged and redesigned by a succession of architects, it includes at its core the oldest surviving building of the campus. The building was declared a National Historic Landmark in 1965 for its architecture and its association with nation's oldest state-supported military academy.

== Description and history ==
The campus of the Virginia Military Institute (VMI) is located on the north side of the city of Lexington. At its center is a large parade ground, around which a significant number of the institute's buildings are arrayed. The Old Barracks are located along the northeastern edge of the ground, forming a long arcing facade. There are three sections, each of which presents a bank of windows, with a projecting central entry. The projecting sections have polygonal towers with crenellated tops at the corners, with similar lower towers at the eastern end of the structure and at the junctions between the sections. The tower at the western end of the structure is square with angled corners, and matches the height of the entrance towers.

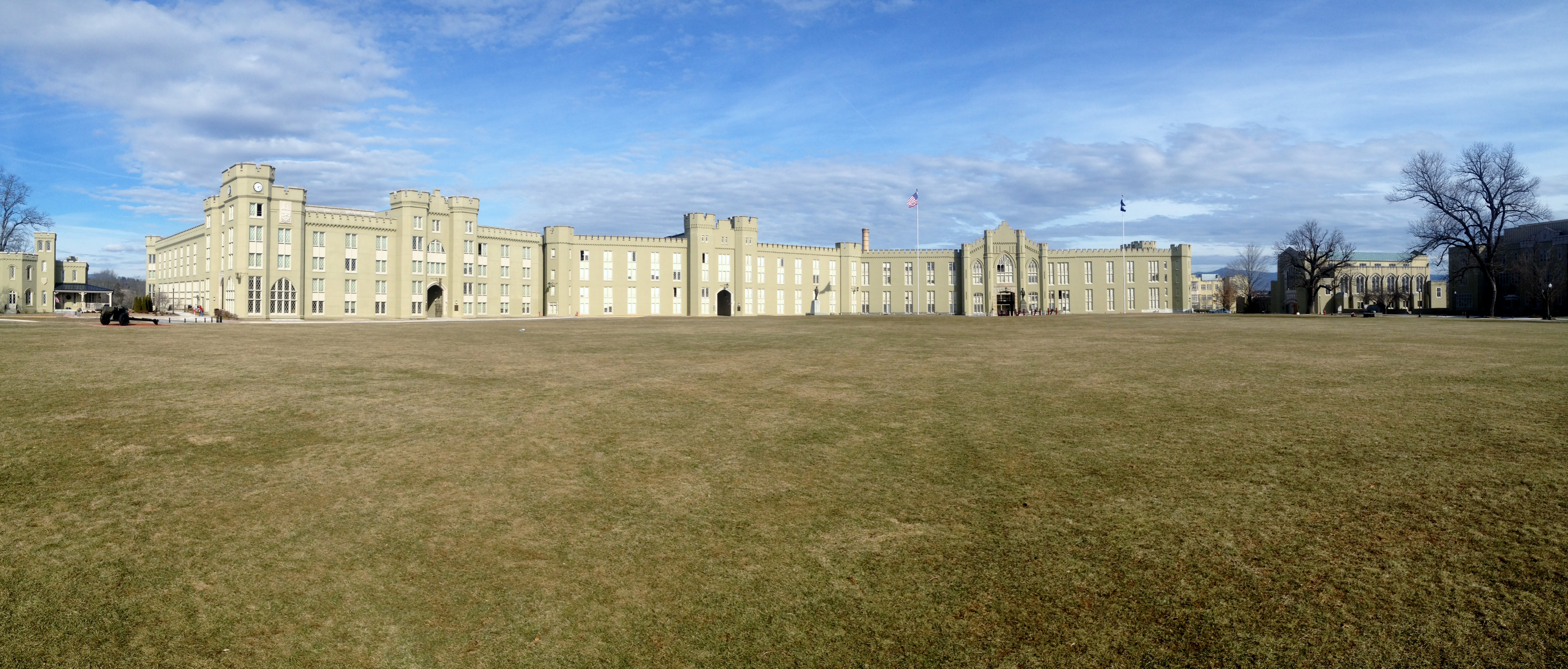

VMI was founded in 1839, and is the first and best-known of the nation's state-funded military academies. Most of the institute's early buildings were demolished during the American Civil War, with only a portion of the barracks building surviving. This portion was designed by architect Alexander Jackson Davis and built in 1848, and was a fine piece of early Gothic Revival architecture that influenced the other buildings present on the campus. In the 1890s the building was redesigned by Isaac Eugene Alexander Rose, and in 1916 it was enlarged to design work by Benjamin Grosvenor Goodhue, which created the first complete quadrangle. In 1948 the building was further extended by the addition of a new wing, designed by Carneal and Johnson.

== See also ==
- List of National Historic Landmarks in Virginia
- National Register of Historic Places listings in Lexington, Virginia
