= Son (Sean) Minh Le =

Colonel Son (Sean) Minh Le (May 23, 1960 – April 25, 2015) was Senior Advisor, Iraqi Ministry of Defense International Affairs.

== Background and education ==
Col Le was born and raised in Saigon, South Vietnam. He immigrated to the US in 1975 and resided in Northern Virginia. He graduated from Virginia Military Institute in 1982 with a Bachelor of Science in Electrical Engineering. He obtained a Master in Business Administration from National University in San Diego, California. In 2002, he earned a second Master in Strategic Studies from the US Army War College, in Carlisle, Pennsylvania. Le is the first Vietnamese refugee of the 1975 post-war generation to graduate from VMI and first to achieve the rank of Colonel in the US Armed Forces.

== Military career ==
Le entered the Air Force in 1982 after graduating from the Virginia Military Institute (VMI). He started as a Space and Missile Officer in his early Air Force career. He was promoted to 2nd Lieutenant on October 15, 1982.

Company Grade assignments included Cape Canaveral AFS and Los Angeles AFB; other duties were at Vandenberg AFB, Houston Space Flight Center, and Kennedy Space Center. His operational achievement consisted of launches of AF heavy and medium lift vehicles including the Titan 34D, Titan IV, and Delta II. During the final years of the cold war, Le became the Mission Director of the Strategic Defense Initiative Organization space effort, overseeing the integration and flight of the Infrared Background Signature Survey payload that flew successfully on STS-39 Space Shuttle mission in May 1990. As result of this, he received the prestigious Presidential Manned Flight Award.

Le served as Operations Staff Officer during the Field Grade years. His assignments included both Air and Joint Staff. On the Air Staff, he managed the acquisition of the ICBM Minuteman III Guidance Replacement Program. Also on the Air Staff, Col Le was the National Guard and Reserve Equipment Account manager for the Office of the Air Force Reserve.

Le worked on the Joint Staff between 2002 and 2007. In J-4, Col Le was the Senior War-Planner, responsible for the deployment and execution of US logistic joint forces in support of Operation Iraqi Freedom and Operation Enduring Freedom. He held several leadership positions including Chief of Multi-National Division where he participated with the NATO allies to conduct combat support operations in Afghanistan. In 2005, Le was deployed as part of an Air Expeditionary Force for Operation Iraqi Freedom. He directed all life support elements for over 7,000 airmen as Chief of Staff of the 332nd Air Expeditionary Wing, Balad AB, Iraq.

His last assignment was with the Material and Facilities Directorate, the Office of the Assistant Secretary of Defense for Reserve Affairs. While assigned there, he was the focal point for Reserve Affairs on Joint Base matters. During this time, he successfully rescued a Puerto Rico USMCR unit from losing their training and operations facility. In 2009, he was deployed to Kabul, Afghanistan, as the Director of the Armed Contractor Oversight Directorate, HQ US-Forces Afghanistan. There, he created 100% accountability for oversight management of 18K DoD and 6K DoS Private Security Contractors. He partnered with the Afghan National Police and Army leadership for convoy protection missions. He established a Movement Tracking Center within HQ USFOR-A for the daily monitoring of over 40 convoys and 1,900 trucks for logistical movements in support of NATO military and Afghanistan reconstruction efforts.
