= Bill McDowell (Australian rules footballer) =

Australian rules footballer, born 1905

Personal information
- Full name: William Andrew McDowell
- Born: 10 January 1905; Albury, New South Wales
- Died: 12 February 1964 (aged 59); Greensborough, Victoria
- Height: 184 cm (6 ft 0 in)
- Weight: 92 kg (203 lb)

Playing career^{1}
Years	Club	Games (Goals)
1927–28	North Melbourne	11 (7)
- ^{1} Playing statistics correct to the end of 1928.

William Andrew McDowell (10 January 1905 – 12 February 1964) was an Australian rules footballer who played with North Melbourne in the Victorian Football League (VFL).
