= William Hugh McDowell =

Confederate veteran (1846–1864)

- Born: December 31, 1846; Beattie's Ford, North Carolina
- Died: May 15, 1864 (aged 17); New Market, Virginia
- Military career
- Allegiance: Confederate States of America
- Branch: Confederate States Army
- Service years: 1864
- Rank: Cadet private
- Units: Company B, Corps of Cadets
- Conflicts: American Civil War: Battle of New Market †

William Hugh McDowell (December 31, 1846 – May 15, 1864) was one of the VMI Cadets killed at the Battle of New Market. He entered VMI on August 22, 1863. He was shot in the heart. In the battle, Cabell and Stanard were wounded by the same burst of fire.

McDowell was born on December 31, 1846, in Beattie's Ford, North Carolina to Robert Irvin McDowell and Rebecca Brevard.

== In culture ==
A fictional account of McDowell's participation in the Battle of New Market is featured in The Ghost Cadet, a book by Elaine Marie Alphin.
