= Jaqueline Beverly Stanard =

- Born: April 27, 1845; Orange County, Virginia
- Died: May 15, 1864 (aged 19); New Market, Virginia
- Military career
- Allegiance: Confederate States of America
- Branch: Confederate States Army
- Service years: 1864
- Rank: Cadet private
- Units: Company B, Corps of Cadets
- Conflicts: American Civil War: Battle of New Market †

Jaqueline Beverly Stanard (April 27, 1845 – May 15, 1864) was one of the VMI Cadets killed at the Battle of New Market. He matriculated at V.M.I. on January 20, 1863, from Orange Courthouse, Virginia.

== Early years ==
Jacqueline Beverly Stanard was born on April 27, 1845, in Orange County, Virginia, to Beverly Stanard and Ellen Taliaferro. He was called "Jack" by his friends and "Bev" by his family.

== Battle ==
Cadet Stanard's leg was badly mangled by a shell fragment and he bled to death from his leg wound. Cadet John Sergeant Wise wrote later about finding Stanard on the porch of the Bushong House. "I had come too late. Stanard had breathed his last but a few moments before...His body was still warm and his last message had been words of love. Poor Jack! Playmate, room-mate, friend-farewell." His last "words of love" were "I fell where I wished to fall, fighting for my country, and I did not fight in vain. I die with full confidence in my God. My loved ones must meet me in heaven." His final words, upon hearing the Confederacy had won the battle, were "Thank God". Wise later remarked "He passed through the 'valley of the shadow of death' with a heavenly smile upon his face. Oh, may my last end be like his!"
