= Thomas Garland Jefferson =

Virginia Military Institute cadet (1847–1864)

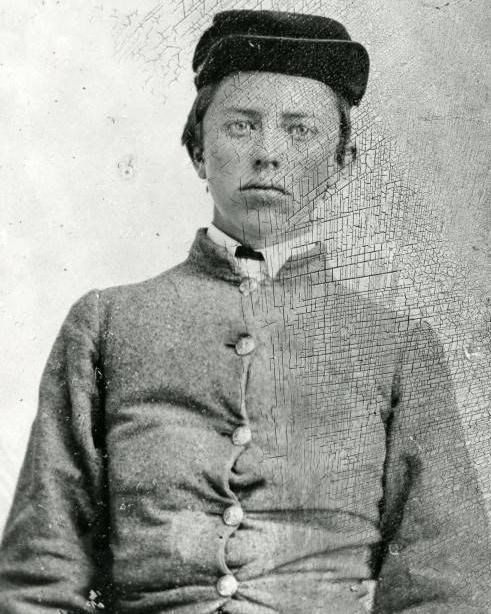
- Jefferson in uniform, c. 1863
- Born: January 1, 1847; Amelia County, Virginia, U.S.
- Died: May 18, 1864 (aged 17); New Market, Virginia, C.S.
- Burial place: Virginia Military Institute, Lexington, Virginia, U.S.
- Military career
- Allegiance: Confederate States
- Service years: 1863-1864
- Rank: Cadet
- Units: Company B, Corps of Cadets, Virginia Military Institute
- Battles: American Civil War; Battle of New Market (DOW)

Thomas Garland Jefferson (January 1, 1847 – May 18, 1864) was a Virginia Military Institute cadet who died of wounds received at the Battle of New Market during the American Civil War.

Jefferson was the great-grand nephew of former United States president Thomas Jefferson.

== Early years and education ==
Jefferson was a son of John Garland Jefferson and Otelia Mansfield Howlett of Winterham. He was their oldest son, one of 14 children, on a plantation growing cotton and tobacco.

== American Civil War ==
On May 15, 1864, at the Battle of New Market, Major General John C. Breckinridge reluctantly ordered the charge of the young cadets to fill a gap in his right wing; the cadets pushed further and overran a Union artillery position, ensuring their place in the Confederacy's last major battlefield victory of the war.

Jefferson was shot in the stomach. When two fellow cadets ran to assist him, he told them to carry on fighting, reportedly saying: "You can do me no good." He died three days later, resting in the home of a local resident, Lydie Clinedinst, after he was found by Cadet Moses Ezekiel, wounded and laying in Clinedinst's farmhouse. Ezekiel (who was Jewish) read from John 14 by his bedside as a makeshift last rites. He is buried below the statue of Virginia Mourning Her Dead sculpted by Ezekiel in his later years.

== See also ==
- John Augustine Washington III, great grandnephew of the first U.S presidents
- Samuel B. Todd, brother-in-law of the 16th U.S presidents
- Samuel Jackson, adoptive grandson of the 7th U.S presidents
