= Political general =

High-ranking military official appointed for reasons other than strategic acumen

A political general is a general officer or other military leader without significant military experience who is given a high position in command for political reasons, through political connections, or to appease certain political blocs and factions.

In the United States, this concept was demonstrated by commissions and appointments during the American Civil War, in both the Union and the Confederacy.

== History ==
=== American Civil War ===
Most of the top generals on the Union and Confederate sides were graduates of West Point and were career military officers. In addition to military training, many of them had battlefield experience gained during the Mexican–American War or the American Indian Wars, such as the Third Seminole War in Florida. Due to the necessity of raising large-scale citizen armies, both presidents, Abraham Lincoln and Jefferson Davis, for various reasons, appointed a number of the so-called political generals. Some of them, such as John A. Logan on the Union side or Richard Taylor on the Confederate, developed into competent military leaders and were respected by their subordinates and superiors alike. Others turned out to be "disastrously incompetent", according to historian James M. McPherson.

==== Appeasement of political groups ====
The most important reason for appointing political generals was to appease important blocs of voters. U.S. President Abraham Lincoln used such appointments as a way to get the support of moderate Democrats for the war and for his administration ("War Democrats").Two of the first three volunteer generals whom Lincoln appointed, John Adams Dix and Benjamin Butler, were all Democrats. They were the three most senior major generals in the Union Army. Republicans were also appointed, including Richard James Oglesby of Illinois.

==== Geopolitical ====
Other promotions were used to gain the support of the specific group they represented, especially in cases of foreign immigrants. One of the largest ethnic groups in the U.S. at the time was relatively recent German immigrants, who had arrived in the late 1840s and early 1850s after the German revolutions of 1848–1849. Prominent ethnic German civilian leaders, such as Franz Sigel and Carl Schurz, both of whose prior military experience before the Civil War was fighting on the losing side of the German revolutions, were appointed to high rank for their usefulness in rallying fellow immigrants to the cause.

Two prominent Irish immigrants were also given promotions, as many Irish had arrived following the famines in Ireland. Thomas F. Meagher and Michael Corcoran were promoted, who before the war had been a captain and a colonel, respectively, in the New York State Militia. Meagher resigned in May 1863, but when Corcoran died in December 1863, the Army revoked Meagher's resignation to keep at least one Irishman in command.

Other officers were highly successful in their attempts to rally large numbers of troops, whether they were native-born or foreign-born. For instance, Daniel Sickles recruited many soldiers from New York.

==== Border states ====
The Confederacy also appointed numerous political generals for the same reasons. They also used many such appointments to influence the Confederate sympathizers in the border states, which had not seceded from the Union. Former Vice President John C. Breckinridge was appointed as a general in the hopes that he would inspire the citizens of Kentucky to join the Confederate Army.

==== Other ====
Another reason for the appointment of political generals during the American Civil War was the significant expansion of the number of men in each army and many volunteer soldiers. Men who were prominent civilian leaders, such as businessmen, lawyers, and politicians, were chosen to continue their leadership in command of a volunteer regiment.

==== Evaluation ====
Ezra J. Warner noted that during the American Civil War, a large number of political generals, including Sigel and Banks for the Union and Breckinridge for the Confederacy, were undoubtedly popular with their men, primarily because of their ties to the specific groups they represented. However, the vast majority were considered incompetent because they were amateur soldiers without prior training or knowledge. This was a particularly large problem for the Union, where such generals were typically given fairly important commands.

Brooks D. Simpson claimed that the misdeeds of three particular political generals on the Union side, Butler, Banks, and Sigel, "contributed to a military situation in the summer of 1864 where the Northern public, anticipating decisive victory with Grant in command, began to wonder whether it was worth it to continue the struggle—something on voters' minds as they pondered whether to give Honest Abe another four years in office. Perhaps Lincoln would have been wiser to dismiss these three men and risk whatever short-term damage his actions might have caused."

Addressing the phenomenon of the Union political generals, Thomas Joseph Goss wrote, "Though much contemporary and historical attention has been placed upon these amateur commanders in the field and highlights their numerous tactical shortcomings, their assignment patterns demonstrate that political factors outweighed any military criteria in the administration's judgment of their success. For the Lincoln administration, the risk of these tactical setbacks was exceeded by the political support amassed every day these popular figures were in uniform, revealing how political generals and their West Point peers were judged using different standards based on distinct calculations of political gain and military effectiveness."

David Work made a cross-section selection of Union political generals appointed by Lincoln, eight Republicans, and eight Democrats, including Francis Preston Blair Jr., John Adams Dix, John A. Logan, and James S. Wadsworth, among others, and scrutinized their performances during the war. He concluded that Lincoln's appointments were mostly successful as they cemented the Union and did not result in critical or unrecoverable battlefield failures. In addition, all Lincoln's appointees, even including such controversial figures as Nathaniel P. Banks, Franz Sigel, and Benjamin F. Butler, demonstrated promising results as logistical, recruitment and political managers in the war's tumultuous times.

Benton R. Patterson emphasized that Union political generals who understood their shortcomings regarding military education and experience, i.e., former congressman John A. Logan, who rose through the war from a regimental commander to the commanding general of the Army of the Tennessee, did rather well; some, who thought that common sense, practicality, and life experience are enough to wage war, i.e., Major General Nathaniel Banks, wrought havoc on the battlefield, causing unnecessary loss of lives. Patterson cited Major General Henry Halleck, a West Pointer, who wrote in April 1864 to General William Tecumseh Sherman commenting on Banks's exploits in Louisiana, "It seems but little better than murder to give important commands to such a man as Banks, Butler, McClernand, Sigel, and Lew Wallace, and yet it seems impossible to prevent it." To all political generals, Patterson attributed a tendency of insubordination, as they frequently used their political connections to overwrite particular orders from their superiors. In addition, several generals, including Logan and Blair, left their commands to participate in the 1864 presidential campaign on behalf of Lincoln, to the displeasure of professional soldiers.

Lincoln, as commander-in-chief, experienced problems not only with political generals but with professional West-Pointers as well, as all were unable to realize on the battlefield the decisive Union's advantage regarding manpower and military resources until Ulysses S. Grant became the general-in-chief in March 1864. Despite all of that, Lincoln, who possessed a limited military background as a captain of a militia during the Black Hawk War, did not succumb to a temptation to become involved in a war on a tactical level; instead, as James M. McPherson put it, he chose to persist "through a terrible ordeal of defeats and disappointments". On the other side, President Jefferson Davis, who was a West Point graduate, served competently as a regimental commander during the Mexican War, and was an able United States Secretary of War under Franklin Pierce in 1853–1857, frequently intervened into the conduct of war below strategic level and made appointments based on political necessity and personal attachments; these war-making approaches did not serve him well.

== List of United States political generals ==
=== List of prominent political generals ===
The following is a partial list of some of the more prominent political generals on both sides, and a brief sketch of their war service.

==== War of 1812 ====
- Henry Dearborn, former Secretary of War (1801–1809), was appointed as Senior Officer of the US Army in 1812. Despite his largely ineffective command, he continued serving until the war ended in 1815.
- Stephen van Rensselaer, candidate for Governor of New York, commanded American forces at the Battle of Queenston Heights.

==== Mexican–American War ====
- James Pinckney Henderson was the incumbent governor of Texas who was granted permission from the state legislature to personally lead Texas troops in the field with the rank of major general. Henderson led the so-called "Texas Division" at the Battle of Monterrey.
- Joseph Lane, an Indiana Democrat, gained a reputation as "Rough and Ready No. 2", reminiscent of Zachary Taylor's nickname.
- Franklin Pierce was a politician from New Hampshire who had some notable military skills. He sustained a wound at the Battle of Churubusco and fainted on the field due to the loss of blood. His political rivals described this incident as cowardice, but that was not enough to keep him from attaining the Presidency.
- John A. Quitman was a judge and former governor of Mississippi who served as a brigade commander under Zachary Taylor and as a division commander under Winfield Scott. Later in the war, he also served as the military governor of Mexico City.

==== American Civil War ====
===== Union =====
- Nathaniel Prentice Banks, former Governor of Massachusetts, held numerous commands during the war. He commanded the original V Corps (later XII Corps) at First Winchester, and also fought without distinction at Cedar Mountain and Second Bull Run as part of the Army of Virginia. He was transferred to the Department of the Gulf and took part in the capture of Port Hudson, as well as the Red River Campaign. After that disastrous campaign, he was relieved of command.
- Francis P. Blair Jr., Congressman from Missouri who aided Union efforts early in the war to save his state for the Union. He became a major general in the Union Army and eventually rose to become a corps commander. He enjoyed the confidence of Sherman, who was generally skeptical of political generals. While most politicians either resigned their seats in Congress or resigned from their military commission, Blair retained his seat in Congress while still serving in the field. His brother was Montgomery Blair, who was Postmaster General in Lincoln's Cabinet.
- Benjamin Franklin Butler, State Senator from Massachusetts and Brigadier General in the Massachusetts militia. He lost the war's first land battle at Big Bethel on July 1, 1861, and was later put in charge of the Department of the Gulf, governing the captured New Orleans with strict discipline (and earning the derogatory nickname "Spoons" for his alleged habit of pilfering from Confederate homes). He led the Army of the James during the failed Bermuda Hundred Campaign, the Siege of Petersburg, and at Fort Fisher. After the latter, he was relieved of his command. He was later elected Governor of Massachusetts as a Democrat and ran for president in 1884 for the Greenback Party.
- James A. Garfield, an Ohio State Senator, rose to the rank of major general of volunteers. He served as a brigade commander in the Western Theater. He was also chief of staff to William Rosecrans before being elected to congress in the middle of the war, eventually becoming President of the United States in 1881.
- Joseph Holt, former Postmaster General under James Buchanan. Lincoln appointed him as Judge Advocate General of the Army, later serving as chief prosecutor during his assassination trial.
- John A. Logan, Congressman from Illinois, served as a brigade and division commander in the Western Theater under Ulysses S. Grant and William T. Sherman. Upon the death of James B. McPherson at Atlanta, Logan briefly rose to command of the famed Army of the Tennessee. Although Logan was generally a successful leader, Sherman elected not to keep a non-West Pointer in command of the army. He replaced him with Oliver O. Howard, instead placing Logan in command of a corps. After the war, Logan returned to politics as a Republican.
- John Alexander McClernand, Congressman from Illinois, served in the Western Theater, taking part in the battles of Fort Donelson and Shiloh, and led the Army of the Mississippi against Fort Hindman (Arkansas Post) in 1863 (as part of the Vicksburg Campaign), as well as leading XIII Corps during the Siege of Vicksburg and the Red River Campaign. He was poorly regarded by his peers and frequently quarreled with Generals Ulysses S. Grant and William T. Sherman.
- John McAuley Palmer, Illinois state legislator, Republican party organizer, and Congressional candidate (McClernand defeated him), served in the Western Theater in command of a Division in the XIV Corps and later the XIV Corps itself. In these capacities, he fought in the battles of Stones River, Chickamauga, and Chattanooga. Late in the war, he had a controversial stint as military governor of Kentucky. In postbellum life, he served as Illinois governor and Senator as a Democrat and ran for president in 1896 for the National Democratic Party.
- Alexander Schimmelfennig, a Prussian veteran who helped coordinate the unsuccessful defense of the Rhineland during the Revolution of 1848. Wounded twice at the Battle of Rinnthal, he escaped to Switzerland before the Prussian authorities could capture him but was tried in absentia and sentenced to death. He fled to Paris, London, and finally to the United States, joining many other German "Forty-Eighters" who were later to fight with the Union, such as Louis Blenker, Adolph von Steinwehr, and Carl Schurz. When, in 1862, Lincoln proposed to appoint Schimmelfennig to command a brigade, Secretary of War Stanton protested that better-qualified officers were available. 'His name,' Lincoln replied, '"will make up for any difference there may be", and he walked away repeating Schimmelfennig's name with a chuckle.' Schimmelfennig's brigade suffered high losses at the Battle of Gettysburg, where hundreds of men were taken prisoner by the Confederates after becoming confused in the narrow streets of the town: Schimmelfennig himself was forced to hide in a culvert and in a shed to avoid capture. To the surprise of many who assumed he had been killed, he rejoined his troops several days after the battle. He subsequently contracted malaria and tuberculosis during Sherman's March to the Sea, the latter leading to his death shortly after the end of the war.
- Daniel Sickles, the infamous New York Congressman who had been tried (and acquitted) for the murder of Philip Barton Key II, served as a brigade and division commander for the first two years of the war. He assumed command of the III Corps, Army of the Potomac in early 1863, leading it at Chancellorsville and Gettysburg. At the latter, the unauthorized maneuver of his corps into the Peach Orchard nearly destroyed the Union Army. Sickles lost his leg at this battle and, although he was never officially censured for his action, never again held a field command. After the war, he served as a diplomat and was vital in establishing national battlefield parks, including at Gettysburg.
- Franz Sigel, a German émigré who led, at various times, a division in the Department of Missouri, XI Corps of the Army of the Potomac, and the Department of West Virginia. Though a military academy graduate and former officer in both Baden's army and, later, its revolutionary forces, significant military success evaded him in Europe. As a revolutionary colonel, he had seen his command annihilated by the Prussians at Freiburg in 1848. In 1849, he was briefly Secretary of War and commander-in-chief of the doomed revolutionary republican government of Baden. Still, he then needed to resign from the post after being wounded in a skirmish. He was, however, extremely popular with his German recruits, who shouted the slogan, "I fights mit Sigel!" He provided essential recruiting services for the Union.
- Lew Wallace, formerly of the Indiana State Legislature, fought most famously at Fort Donelson, Shiloh, and the Monocacy, the "Battle That Saved Washington", in July 1864. After the war, Wallace became Governor of New Mexico Territory, wrote the novel Ben-Hur, and served as a U.S. diplomat. His previous military experience had been serving as a volunteer lieutenant during the Mexican–American War.

===== Confederate =====
- William Barksdale, a "Fire-Eater" and former congressman from Mississippi, led a brigade in the Army of Northern Virginia during the first two years of the war until he died in Gettysburg.
- Milledge L. Bonham, a former US congressman and Confederate congressman from South Carolina, led a brigade in the Confederate Army of the Potomac until being elected governor of his home state. After he served as governor, he rejoined the Confederate Army and served in the Carolinas campaign.
- John C. Breckinridge, former vice president under James Buchanan, led various brigade and division commands in the Western Theater. He often quarreled with Braxton Bragg. He served ably at Shiloh and Stones River, and also defeated Franz Sigel (see above) at the Battle of New Market in May 1864. He briefly became the Confederate secretary of war in 1865.
- Thomas Reade Rootes Cobb, a Confederate congressman from Georgia and brother of former governor and Treasury Secretary Howell Cobb, who also served as a general in the Confederate army. Cobb commanded a brigade in the Army of Northern Virginia and became most famous for his defense of Marye's Heights at the Battle of Fredericksburg, where he was killed in action.
- John B. Floyd, former Governor of Virginia and Secretary of War under James Buchanan. He led state militia forces opposing Union operations in western Virginia in 1861 and played a major part in the Fort Donelson fiasco (see Gideon Pillow, below). After that battle, he was relegated to the command of Virginia State Guard troops; he died in 1863.
- James L. Kemper, was elected to the Virginia House of Delegates in 1853 and became speaker of that body in 1861. He was a brigade commander under George Pickett and was wounded and captured during Pickett's Charge. After the war, he was elected as the 37th Governor of Virginia.
- Gideon Pillow, a general of the Mexican–American War and prominent power in the pre-war Democratic Party. Although he opposed secession, he ultimately went south and accepted a commission. He is most widely known for fleeing (along with John B. Floyd) from Fort Donelson in February 1862, leaving the hapless third-in-command, Simon Bolivar Buckner, and the fort's 15,000-man garrison to surrender to Union forces under U.S. Grant while they saved themselves. Commanding a brigade at Stones River, he was allegedly found by division commander Breckinridge to have been cowering behind a tree as his men went into action. After that, he never held another field command.
- Leonidas Polk, the Episcopal bishop of Louisiana and cousin of former president James K. Polk, became the third most senior lieutenant general despite his lack of military experience, primarily due to a close friendship with President Jefferson Davis. In 1861, he led the failed invasion of neutral Kentucky, causing the state to side with the Union. He later commanded a corps in the Army of Tennessee and was killed in the Battle of Marietta.
- Sterling Price, a former US congressman (March 4, 1845 – August 12, 1846) and Governor of Missouri (January 3, 1853 – January 5, 1857) who initially opposed secession but ultimately sided with the Confederacy, led the Missouri State Guard in the 1861 Confederate invasion of the state. He was the Confederate commander at the Battle of Wilson's Creek, and served without distinction at Pea Ridge. He led an unsuccessful invasion of Missouri in 1864, which inadvertently but effectively secured Missouri and Arkansas for the Union.
- William "Extra Billy" Smith, former congressman and governor from Virginia, who was the oldest Confederate field commander. Despite having no previous military experience, he served as a brigade commander at the battles of Antietam, Chancellorsville and Gettysburg. After again being elected governor of Virginia in 1863, he occasionally commanded troops defending Richmond. He was an early advocate of arming blacks to provide more manpower.
- Robert Toombs, former congressman from Georgia and ardent secessionist. Politically ambitious, he was made Secretary of State of the Confederacy but resigned for a field command while holding a seat in the Confederate congress. He led a brigade in the Army of Northern Virginia. His most famous action was the defense of Burnside's Bridge at Antietam, where he was wounded. After that battle, he resigned and served in the Confederate senate.
- Howell Cobb, another former congressman from Georgia and ardent secessionist from Georgia. He served as the President of the Confederate States Provisional Congress, joining the Army of Northern Virginia as a brigade commander. He would see service in the Peninsula Campaign and the Seven Days Battle, and play a key role in stemming the Union tide at the Battle of South Mountain. Transferred out in October 1862 to command the District of Georgia and Florida. He and his troops would play roles in Atlanta campaign, where they constituted the Georgia Reserve Corps, and Wilson's Raid, where he and his troops put up a last-ditch attempt to halt it at the Battle of Columbus.

==== Spanish–American War ====
- Matthew Butler, a former Confederate major general and postwar senator from South Carolina, was appointed major general of volunteers at the beginning of the military expedition to Cuba. After the American victory, he supervised the evacuation of Spanish troops.
- Fitzhugh Lee (nephew of Robert E. Lee), a former Confederate major general and postwar governor of Virginia. He commanded an army corps in the war and served as the military governor of Havana with the rank of major general of volunteers.
- Joseph Wheeler, a former Confederate major general and postwar congressman from Alabama, who is considered to have been one of the finest cavalry officers of the Civil War. The U.S. government was wary about placing staging points for the Cuba expedition in Southern states, which were still deeply mistrustful of the federal government after suffering the trauma of losing the Civil War and then going through the Reconstruction that followed. It was decided to allow Wheeler to rejoin the US Army—from which he had resigned as a second lieutenant in 1861—at the rank of major general of volunteers. This proved to be an effective public-relations measure, helping to unite the still deeply scarred region with the rest of the country against a common enemy. Wheeler was given command of the cavalry division for the invasion of Cuba, during which he was also nominally second in command of V Corps. An oft-told anecdote has the elderly Wheeler, in the excitement of leading men into battle again, allegedly shouting to his men, "Let's go, boys! We've got the damn Yankees on the run again!" Despite that apparent hiccup of memory, Wheeler proved still to be a competent commander throughout the successful campaign, and was a senior member of the peace commission at its end.
