= Adolphus Buschbeck =

Adolphus (Adolph) Buschbeck (March 23, 1822 – May 28, 1883) commanded the 27th Pennsylvania Infantry in the Army of the Potomac and a brigade in that army and later in the Army of the Cumberland during the American Civil War.

== Early life ==
Buschbeck was born in Koblenz, Kingdom of Prussia. He migrated to the United States in 1849 and settled in Philadelphia, Pennsylvania. He taught mathematics at a Philadelphia high school.

== Civil War ==
Buschbeck volunteered for service in the Civil War, becoming lieutenant colonel of the 27th Pennsylvania Infantry in September 1861. He was appointed colonel of the 27th Pennsylvania Infantry by October 2, 1861, following the resignation of Colonel Max Einstein. As colonel, Buschbeck took part in the Battle of Cross Keys under the command of Maj. Gen. John C. Frémont.

Buschbeck next served in 2nd Brigade, 1st Division of the I Corps of the Army of Virginia, which later became XI Corps. He became acting brigade commander at the Second Battle of Bull Run, when Julius Stahel was promoted to division command. In the Army of the Potomac, Buschbeck served under Franz Sigel and Oliver Otis Howard. At the Battle of Chancellorsville he commanded 1st Brigade, 2nd Division of the XI Corps under Adolph von Steinwehr. Buschbeck's brigade was on the left of the corps when the Confederate flanking attack hit the corps under the command of General Howard. His brigade was redeployed into the path of the Confederate advance; and Buschbeck's stand against the Confederates, until flanked out of his position, earned him praise even from critics of the German troops present at Chancellorsville. Howard, in his report, even lauded Buschbeck's "praiseworthy firmness".

After Chancellorsville, Buschbeck went on leave, missing the Battle of Gettysburg. (Charles Coster commanded the brigade in his absence.) After returning to the army, he was transferred to the Western Theater, under the command of Maj. Gen. Joseph Hooker. Buschbeck's brigade was present at the Battle of Wauhatchie and the Battle of Missionary Ridge, where it was engaged on the Union left under Maj. Gen. William Tecumseh Sherman in the attack on Tunnel Hill. When XI Corps was combined with XII Corps into the XX Corps under Hooker, Buschbeck was the highest ranking German officer retained in command. He led a brigade under John W. Geary (2nd Brigade, 2nd Division) in the Atlanta campaign, in action at the Battle of Rocky Face Ridge, the Battle of Resaca, and the Battle of Dallas before being mustered out of the service. Buschbeck's regiment left for Philadelphia on March 25, 1864. Nonetheless, he is listed as brigade commander April 16 to May 22, 1864. Buschbeck served with distinction but never received a promotion, even by brevet, to the rank of brigadier general.

== Postbellum career ==
After leaving armed service, Buschbeck taught at the Episcopal Academy in Philadelphia. He married a Miss Horner in 1871, and his wife and a daughter survived him. In ill health, he left for Europe where he died, in Florence, Italy in 1883.
