= Julius Stahel =

US Army general (1827–1912)

Julius H. Stahel-Számwald
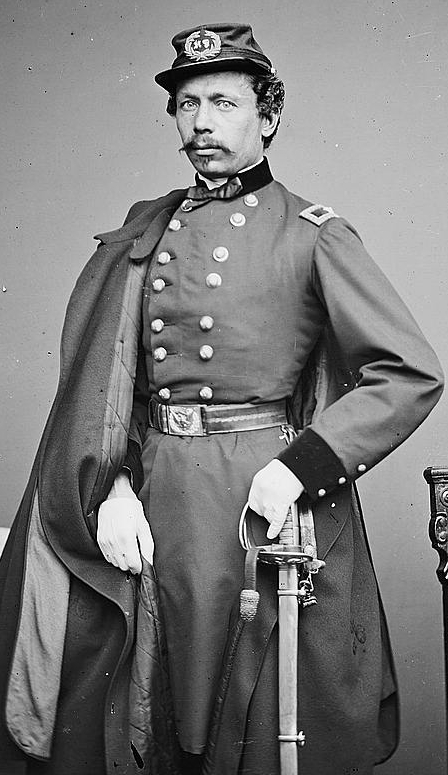
- Stahel in the 1860s
- Born: Gyula Számwald; November 5, 1825; Szeged, Kingdom of Hungary
- Died: December 4, 1912 (aged 87); New York City, New York, U.S.
- Burial place: Arlington National Cemetery
- Military career
- Allegiance: Austrian Empire; Hungary; United States of America; Union
- Branch: Austrian Army; Hungarian Revolutionary Army; United States Army; Union Army
- Service years: Hungarian Revolutionary Army 1848–1849; United States Army 1861–1865
- Rank: First Lieutenant (Austria); First Lieutenant (Hungary); Major General (USV)
- Commands: 8th New York Infantry Regiment; 1st Bde, 1st Div, I Corps; 1st Div, XI Corps; Stahel's Cavalry Division
- Conflicts: Hungarian Revolution of 1848; American Civil War: First Battle of Bull Run; Battle of Cross Keys; Second Battle of Bull Run; Battle of New Market; Battle of Piedmont
- Awards: Medal of Honor

Julius H. Stahel-Számwald (born Gyula Számwald; November 5, 1825 – December 4, 1912) was a Hungarian soldier who emigrated to the United States and became a Union general in the American Civil War. After the war, he served as a U.S. diplomat, a mining engineer, and a life insurance company executive. He received the Medal of Honor for gallantry in action at the Battle of Piedmont in 1864.

== Birth and early years ==
Stahel was born in Szeged, Kingdom of Hungary, 200 kilometres (120 mi) southeast of Budapest. After schooling in Szeged and Budapest, he entered the Austrian Army, rising to the rank of lieutenant. Stahel joined the movement for Hungarian independence led by Lajos Kossuth during the Revolution of 1848. He served on the staffs of Gen. Artúr Görgey and Gen. Richard Debaufre Guyon. When the Hungarian uprising against the Habsburg dynasty was put down in 1849, he fled to Prussia and then to England before migrating to the United States in 1859. Until the outbreak of the American Civil War, he worked for Deutsche illustrirte Familienblätter, a German-language newspaper in New York City.

== Civil War service ==
In 1861, with the outbreak of war, Stahel and Louis Blenker recruited the 8th New York Volunteer Infantry Regiment, the 1st German Rifles or Blenker's Rifles. Stahel, who had dropped the "Számwald" portion of his surname, became the regiment's lieutenant colonel, while Blenker served as colonel. Stahel first saw combat at the First Battle of Bull Run, leading the regiment in Blenker's first brigade of Dixon Miles's Fifth Division. The regiment covered the flight of the Union Army of Brig. Gen. Irvin McDowell. The 8th New York served in Blenker's division of the newborn Army of the Potomac until it was transferred to western Virginia. Stahel become a colonel on August 11, 1861 and a brigadier general three months later.

Stahel led a brigade under Maj. Gen. John C. Fremont in the Mountain Department during an incursion into the Shenandoah Valley of Virginia. His brigade was of Fremont's left at the Battle of Cross Keys in which Stonewall Jackson stopped the Union advance into the Valley. Stahel's position on the left exposed his command to a flank attack by Isaac Trimble's brigade as Fremont was attempting to turn the right of the Confederate line.

By July 1862, Stahel was commander of the first brigade of Robert C. Schenck's first division Army of Virginia in the corps led by Franz Sigel in Maj. Gen. John Pope's Army of Virginia. At the Second Battle of Bull Run, Schenck was wounded and Stahel became acting commander of the division. (Adolphus Buschbeck succeeded to command of the brigade.) Stahel's brigade was one of two that covered Sigel's retreat when Pope's army was defeated.

Stahel rose to division command by late 1862 and was promoted to major general on March 14, 1863. He briefly commanded the XI Corps during the fall of 1862.

In March 1863 Stahel was assigned to command a Union cavalry division in the defenses of Washington, D.C. When the division joined the Army of the Potomac in June 1863, Alfred Pleasonton had Stahel removed, promoting Judson Kilpatrick in his place. He then served as cavalry commander in the Department of the Susquehanna at the time of the Gettysburg Campaign.

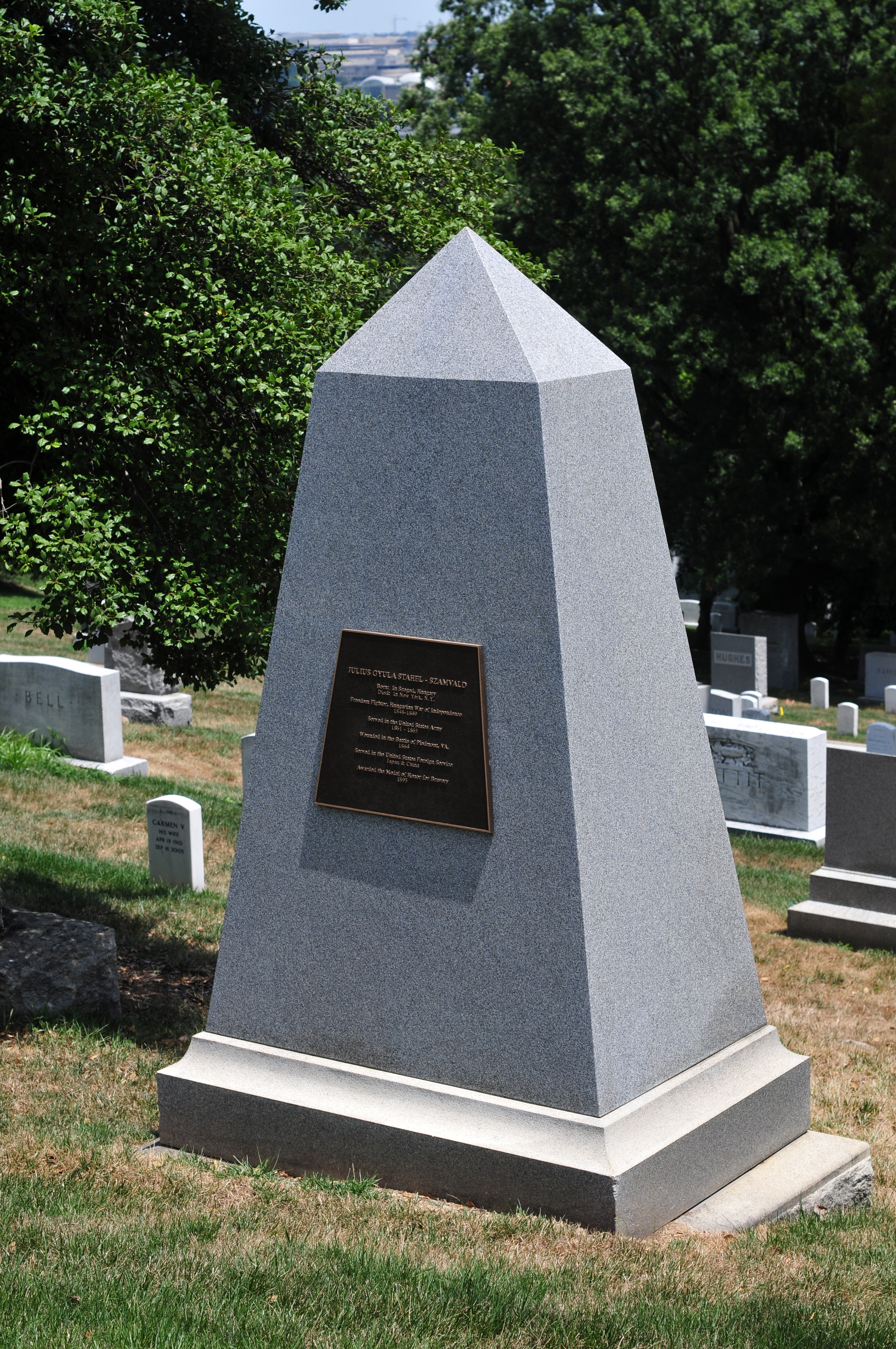
Julius Stahel's grave at Arlington National Cemetery

By the spring of 1864, Stahel was commander of the 1st Cavalry Division under Franz Sigel in the Shenandoah Valley. At the Battle of New Market, on May 15, 1864, his division was on the left of Sigel's line. It attacked the Confederate line but was repulsed by artillery fire. The division recoiled under attack by the Confederate forces of John C. Breckinridge when they counterattacked.

At the Battle of Piedmont on June 5, 1864, serving as cavalry commander under Maj. Gen. David Hunter, Stahel distinguished himself under fire until he was hit in the shoulder. This led to Stahel's receiving the Medal of Honor, on November 4, 1893, for leading his division until seriously wounded. Stahel served, after recovering from his wound, on court-martial duty until he resigned on February 8, 1865.

== Postbellum career ==
After the Civil War, Stahel served in the United States diplomatic corps as consul in Yokohama, (1866–1869) and Osaka, Japan (1877–1884). After that he was United States Consul General in Shanghai, China (1884–1885). Between diplomatic assignments, he worked as a mining engineer. Upon returning to the United States for reasons of health, Stahel worked for the Equitable Life Insurance Company in New York City.

Stahel died in a New York City at 87 years of age. After a funeral in Washington, he was buried in the Arlington National Cemetery.

== Medal of Honor citation ==
Stahel received a Medal of Honor for gallantry at Piedmont

Rank and organization: Major General, U.S. Volunteers. Place and date: At Piedmont, Va., June 5, 1864. Entered service at: New York, N.Y. Born: November 5, 1825, Hungary. Date of issue: November 4, 1893.

Citation:

Led his division into action until he was severely wounded.

== See also ==
- List of Medal of Honor recipients
- List of American Civil War Medal of Honor recipients: Q–S
- List of American Civil War generals (Union)
