= 8th New York Infantry Regiment =

- Obverse of the Regimental flag
- Active: April 23, 1861, to April 23, 1863
- Country: United States
- Allegiance: Union
- Branch: Infantry
- Nickname: Blenker's Rifles
- Engagements: American Civil War: Battle of Great Falls; First Battle of Bull Run; Battle of Cross Keys; Battle of New Market; Battle of Rappahannock Station I; Second Battle of Bull Run

Reverse of the Regimental flag.

The 8th New York Infantry Regiment was an infantry regiment that served in the Union Army during the American Civil War. Largely composed of German Americans, many of whom were Forty-Eighter immigrants, the regiment was also known as the First German Rifles or Blenker's Rifles.

== Service ==
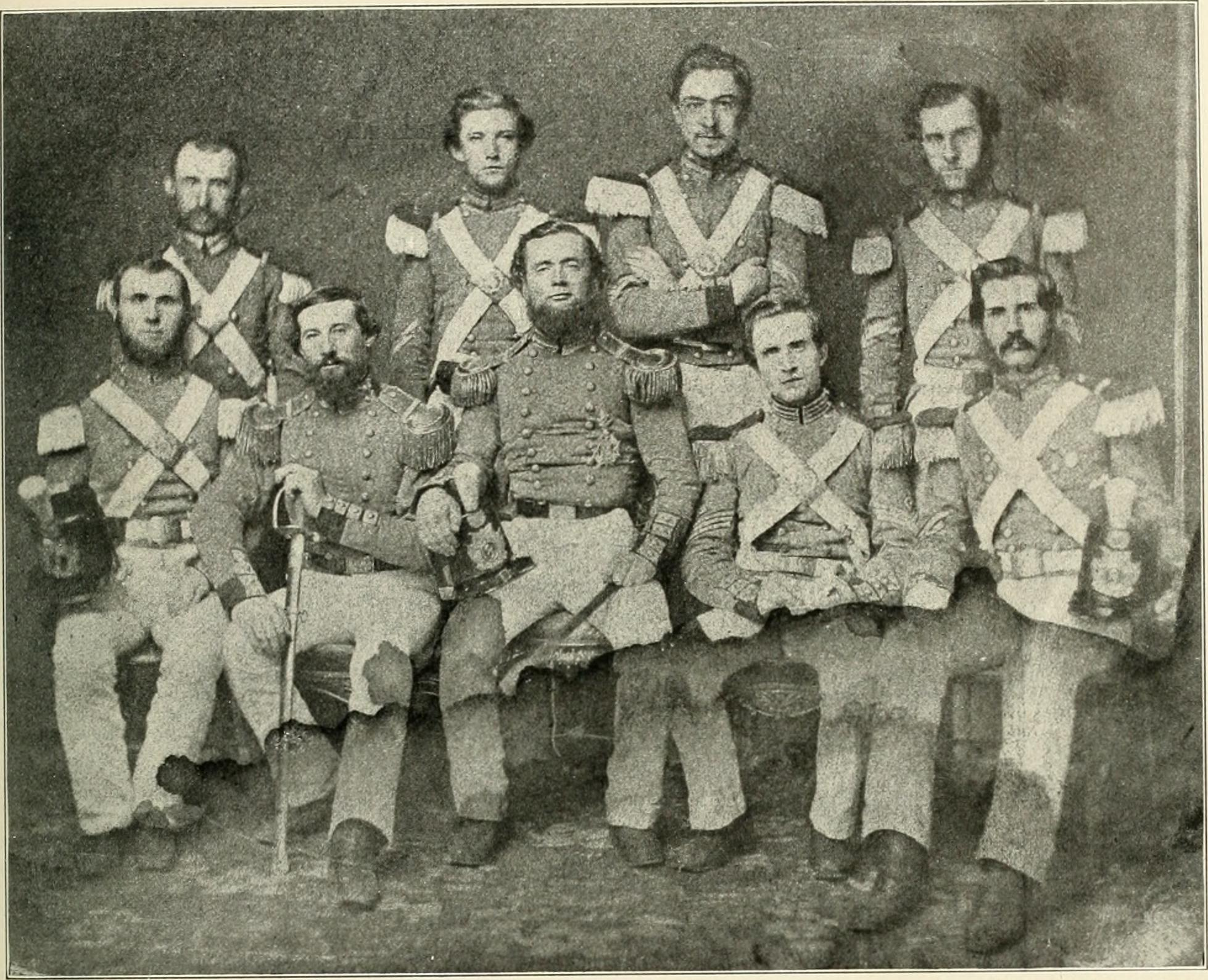
8th New York officers garbed in the same uniforms that they wore to the Mexican War

The 8th (the 1st German Rifles) was recruited in New York City, there mustered into federal service on April 23 1861, for two years, and left for Washington on May 27 under the command of Col. Louis Blenker. At Miller's Farm the troops encamped and on July 10 were ordered to move toward Manassas as part of the 2nd brigade, 4th division of the Army of the Potomac. During the battle of Bull Run the 8th was held in reserve and assisted in covering the retreat. At the beginning of the battle, Varian's New York Battery under the regiment were only one of two 3-month service volunteer units to refuse participation and walk away from the battlefield. Both units were strongly criticized for its actions.

The following winter it was quartered at Roach's Mills and Hunter's Chapel, VA, moved to Winchester in March, 1862, and in May joined Maj. Gen. Fremont at Petersburg. It participated in the pursuit of Lieut. Gen. Jackson in the Shenandoah Valley, and as part of Blenker's division fought at the battles of Cross Keys and New Market. In the battle of Cross Keys its killed, wounded and missing numbered 220 out of a total of 550 engaged.

At Middletown, the 8th was assigned to the 1st brigade, 1st division, I Corps, Army of Virginia, under Maj. Gen. Pope, and with that army took part in the battles of Sulphur springs and the second Bull Run. In September, it became a part of XI Corps and reached Fredericksburg immediately after the battle; camped during the winter at Stafford Court House and Brooks' station, and was mustered out of the service at the latter place on April 23, 1863.

The members whose term of service had not expired were formed into one company, the independent company 8th NY, and performed guard duty at the corps headquarters until April 5, 1864, when they were assigned to the 68th New York Volunteer Infantry Regiment. The 8th lost 93 members by death from wounds, and 40 from disease, accident and imprisonment.

== Casualties ==
The regiment suffered 369 fatalities.

== Commanders ==
- Colonel Louis Blenker (Note: Born at Worms, Germany, he had served as an Uhlan gaining a commission due to his gallantry. After leaving active duty, he became a colonel in the Worms militia and during the German Revolutionary party of 1848, led it in the insurgency. Forced to flee to Switzerland, whence he emigrated to the United States settling in New York. Upon the outbreak of the Civil War, he organized the 8th New York Volunteer Infantry Regiment. For more information, see his Wikipedia article.)
- Colonel Julius Stahel (Note: Born in Szeged, Kingdom of Hungary, 200 km southeast of Budapest, he entered the Austrian Army, rising to the rank of lieutenant. Joining the Revolution of 1848, he served as a staff officer. When the revolution failed, he fled to Prussia and then to England before migrating to the United States in 1859. Until the outbreak of the American Civil War, he worked for Deutsche illustrirte Familienblätter, a German-language newspaper in New York City. For more information, see his Wikipedia article.)
- Colonel Francis Wutschell
- Colonel Felix Salm-Salm (Note: Prince Felix Constantin Alexander Johann Nepomuk of Salm-Salm, was born at Anholt Castle, the Residenz of the former Principality of Salm, which had been incorporated into the Prussian Province of Westphalia. Third and youngest son of Prince Florentin, he trainedat a cadet-school in Berlin and became an officer in the Prussian 11th Hussar Regiment in 1846. Early on he participated in the First Schleswig War between northern Germany and Denmark. After the war he joined the Austrian army, serving in the Austro-Sardinian War of 1859. However, substantial gambling debts as well as several scandals and duels finally forced him to emigrate in 1861 to the United States where he offered his services to the Union Army in the American Civil War. For more information, see his Wikipedia article.)

== See also ==
- 8th Regiment New York State Militia Infantry - served as the "8th New York Volunteer Infantry Regiment" during the Spanish–American War
- List of New York Civil War regiments
