= Adolph von Steinwehr =

German-born American military officer (1822–1877)

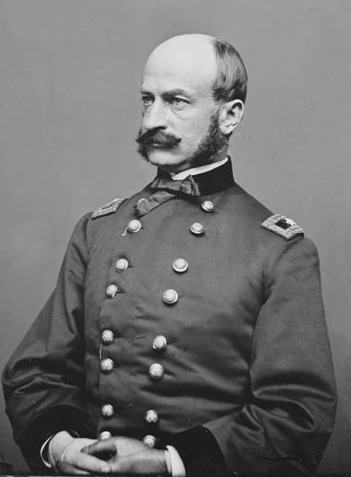
- Adolph von Steinwehr
- Born: September 22, 1822; Blankenburg, Brunswick, Germany
- Died: February 25, 1877 (aged 54); Buffalo, New York
- Burial place: Albany Rural Cemetery, Menands, New York
- Military career
- Allegiance: Brunswick; United States of America
- Branch: Brunswick Army; United States Army; Union Army
- Service years: 1841–1847; 1861–1865
- Rank: Lieutenant (Brunswick); Brigadier General (USA)
- Units: Army of the Potomac; Army of the Cumberland
- Commands: von Steinwehr's Brigade, XI Corps
- Conflicts: American Civil War: First Battle of Bull Run; Valley Campaign; Northern Virginia Campaign; Battle of Chancellorsville; Battle of Gettysburg; Battle of Wauhatchie; Battle of Chattanooga
- Other work: geographer, cartographer, author

Baron Adolph Wilhelm August Friedrich von Steinwehr (September 25, 1822 – February 25, 1877) was a German-Brunswick army officer who emigrated to the United States, became a geographer, cartographer, and author, and served as a Union general in the American Civil War.

== Early life ==
Steinwehr was born in Blankenburg, in the Duchy of Brunswick, Germany, the son of a military family. (His grandfather Friedrich Wilhelm von Steinwehr (1733–1809) was General in the Prussian Army of Frederick the Great) He attended the Brunswick Military Academy and was commissioned a lieutenant in the Brunswick Army in 1841. In 1847 he resigned his commission and emigrated to the United States, settling in Alabama. He served as an engineer in the United States Coast Survey, surveying the United States–Mexico border and Mobile Bay, Alabama, but his desire to serve in a combat position in the Mexican–American War was denied and he returned to Brunswick in 1849, but not before marrying 19-year-old Florence Mary of Mobile, Alabama. He returned to the United States in 1854 and purchased a farm near Wallingford, Connecticut. He later moved to New York state.

== Civil War ==
At the start of the Civil War, Steinwehr raised a regiment, consisting primarily of German immigrants, the 29th New York Volunteer Infantry Regiment, which he commanded at the First Battle of Bull Run. The regiment was in reserve during the battle, but served an important screening role during the Union retreat. He was promoted to brigadier general on October 12, 1861, and commanded the 2nd Brigade of Louis Blenker's division of the Army of the Potomac. This brigade was moved into Maj. Gen. John C. Frémont's Mountain Department on April 1, 1862, and it fought in the Valley Campaign against Maj. Gen. Thomas J. "Stonewall" Jackson. Fremont's command was expanded into an army corps, which was soon commanded by Maj. Gen. Franz Sigel, another German immigrant. Steinwehr was given the 2nd Division in that corps. It was assigned to the Army of Virginia, under Maj. Gen. John Pope, and participated in the Northern Virginia Campaign, but had little role in the Second Battle of Bull Run. Although the corps joined the Army of the Potomac, the division did not fight at the Battle of Antietam or the Battle of Fredericksburg.

The command of what was now called the XI Corps changed to Maj. Gen. Oliver O. Howard in 1863, and Steinwehr continued to command the division in the Battle of Chancellorsville and the Battle of Gettysburg. The corps was the victim of the surprise flanking attack by Stonewall Jackson at Chancellorsville on May 2, 1863, and the overwhelming attack by Lt. Gen. Richard S. Ewell's Second Corps on the first day of Gettysburg, July 1, 1863. At Chancellorsville, Steinwehr's division had one brigade, that of Col Adolphus Buschbeck involved in resisting Jackson's attack. At Gettysburg, when the corps was forced to retreat back through the town to Cemetery Hill, Col Charles Coster took a brigade of Steinwehr's division out to the edge of the town, where it sacrificed itself buying time for the retreating soldiers of the other two divisions. These two defeats seriously degraded the combat effectiveness of the XI Corps and humiliated many of the German immigrant soldiers in the corps. Nevertheless, Steinwehr was well thought of by his superiors. After Chancellorsville, General Howard wrote that Steinwehr's bearing during the battle was "cool, collected and judicious." Brig. Gen. Alpheus Williams, a fellow division commander, described him as a "remarkably intelligent and agreeable person."

In September 1863, two divisions of the XI Corps, those of Steinwehr and MG Carl Schurz, were transferred to the Western Theater to help relieve the besieged Union army in Chattanooga, becoming part of the Army of the Cumberland. They served under Maj. Gen. Joseph Hooker in the Battle of Wauhatchie, where the brigade of Col Orland Smith from Steinwehr's division distinguished itself. Buschbeck's brigade was engaged alongside Maj. Gen. William T. Sherman's command at the Third Battle of Chattanooga. After that battle the XI Corps was combined with the equally depleted XII Corps to form the new XX Corps. That corps fought under Maj. Gen. William T. Sherman in the Atlanta campaign and March to the Sea, but Steinwehr was essentially reorganized out of his job and he commanded no more combat units during the war. He resigned his commission on July 3, 1865.

== Postbellum life ==
After the war, Steinwehr was employed as a geographer and cartographer. He returned to Connecticut to accept a professorship at Yale University. He moved to Washington, D.C., then to Ohio, and returned to New York. He died in Buffalo, New York, lay in state at the Buffalo Arsenal, and is buried in Albany Rural Cemetery, Menands, New York. Steinwehr was a prolific author, including A School Geography: Embracing a Mathematical, Physical, and Political Descriptions of the Earth (published in 1870); co-author of Primary Geography (1870) and An Elementary Treatise on Physical Geography (1873); editor of The Centennial Gazetteer of the United States (1874). He is memorialized by the prominent Steinwehr Avenue in the borough of Gettysburg, Pennsylvania.

== See also ==
- List of American Civil War generals (Union)
- German Americans in the Civil War

== Notes ==
Military offices
Preceded by Franz Sigel	Commander of the XI Corps; February 22, 1863 – March 5, 1863	Succeeded by Carl Schurz
