= Elise Blenker =

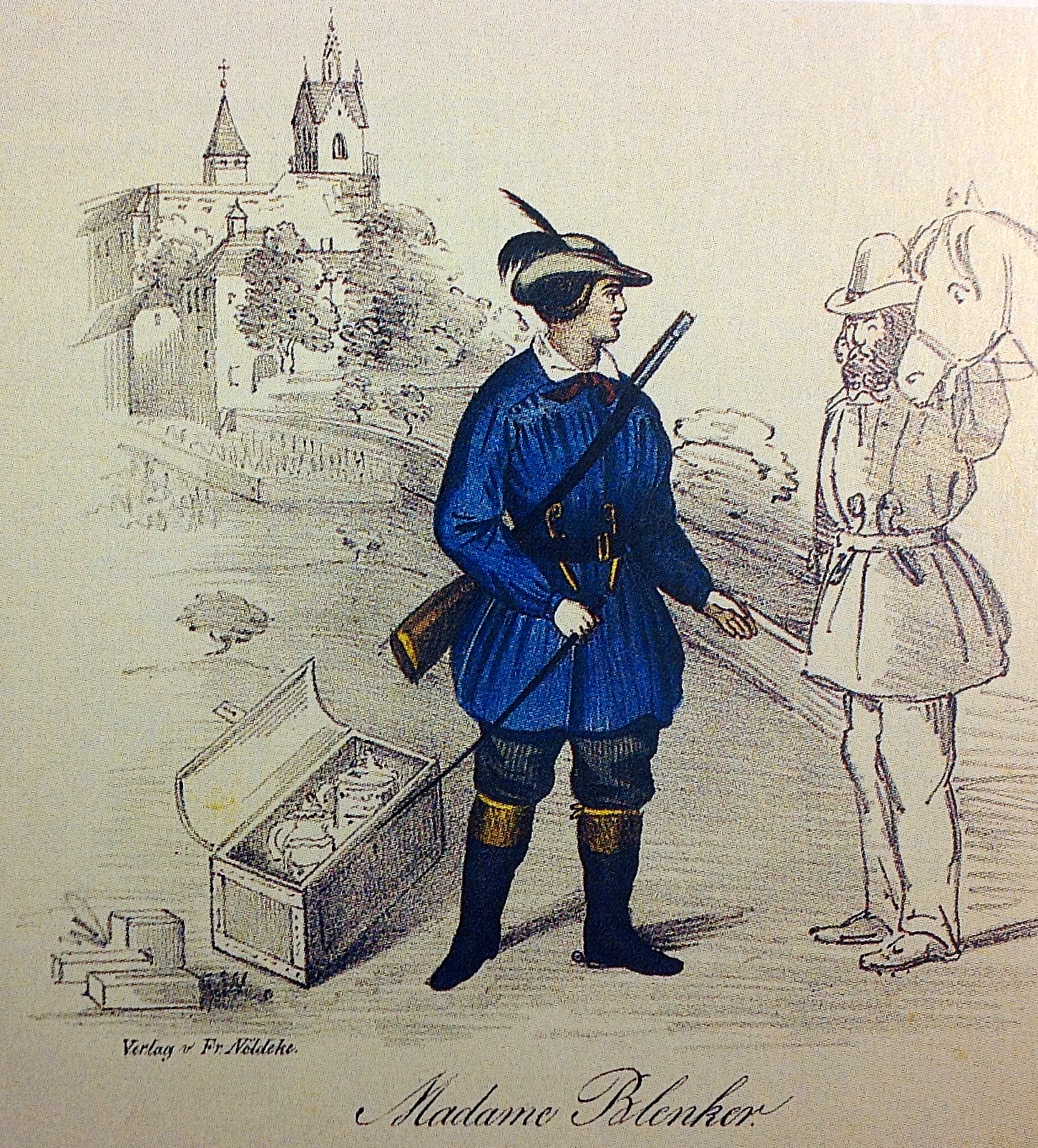
- An 1849 depiction of Blenker
- Born: 1824
- Died: 1908 (aged 83–84); Mount Vernon

Elise Blenker (1824 − 15 May 1908) was the wife of Louis Blenker, a German revolutionary officer of the years 1848/1849. Elise was also actively involved in various actions of the German revolutions of 1848–49 in the Palatinate and in Baden.

== Life in Germany ==
Elise Blenker (née Aue) was born in Köthen, Saxony-Anhalt. She was the daughter of an evangelical pastor, Johann Christian Aue. In 1843 she married the former Uhlan officer, Louis Blenker, in Worrms in the Grand Duchy of Hesse. At this time Louis was running a wine trading business in Worms. In 1848, he became a colonel in the Worms militia. When the revolution of 1848, broke out in Baden, Elise accompanied her husband on his campaigns, partially dressed in military uniform. At this time, Elise met with other revolutionary women, including Kathinka Zitz-Halein, Emma Herwegh, Amalie Struve and Mathilde Franziska Anneke. On 20–21 May Elise and her husband took part in an unsuccessful attack on Landau. She also played a decisive role in the plundering of the Castle of Eberstein in Baden.

== Life in the United States ==
After the suppression of the revolution, Elise was compelled to flee with her husband, first to Switzerland, and then in 1850 to the United States. With her father's help, Elise and Louis built a new life in Rockland County, where they ran a dairy farm. Together Elise and Louis had four children (three daughters and a son). Upon the outbreak of the Civil War in 1861 Louis organized the 8th New York Volunteer Infantry Regiment, of which he became colonel. For his gallantry at Bull Run he was raised to the rank of brigadier general of volunteers. In October 1863 Louis died of injuries sustained while with his command at Warrenton, Virginia, leaving Elise and their children in poverty. Elise was unable to cover the cost of his funeral, and had to turn to friends and family for help. Her widow's pension was later increased from 30 to 50 US dollars a month.

Elise Blenker died on 15 May 1908 in her daughter's house in Mount Vernon (New York).
