= I Corps (Union army) =

- I Corps badge (circle)
- Active: 1862–1864
- Country: United States of America
- Branch: Union Army
- Type: Army Corps
- Size: Corps
- Part of: Army of the Potomac
- Engagements: American Civil War

Commanders
- Notable commanders: Irvin McDowell; Joseph Hooker; John F. Reynolds †; John Newton

Insignia
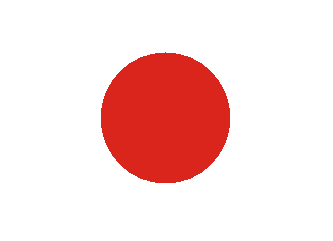
- 1st Division

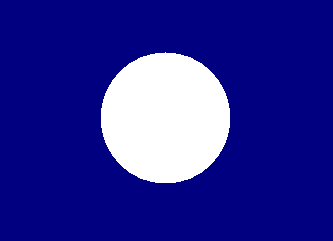
- 2nd Division

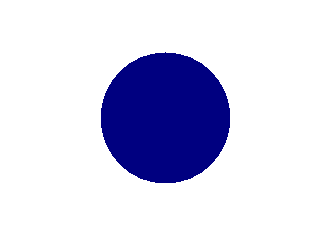
- 3rd Division

There were four formations in the Union Army designated as I Corps (or First Army Corps) during the American Civil War.

Three were short-lived:

- In the Army of Virginia, a command later known as XI Corps (Army of the Potomac) and (Army of the Cumberland):
  - John C. Frémont (June 26 – June 29, 1862)
  - Franz Sigel (June 29 – September 12, 1862)
- In the Army of the Ohio and Army of the Cumberland:
  - Alexander M. McCook (September 29 – November 5, 1862)
- In the Army of the Mississippi:
  - George W. Morgan (January 4 – 12, 1863)

The other, the I Corps, Army of the Potomac, also temporarily known as III Corps, Army of Virginia, is the subject of this article.

The term "First Corps" is also sometimes used to describe the First Veteran Corps from 1864 to 1866.

== History ==
The I Corps was created on March 3, 1862, when President Abraham Lincoln ordered the creation of a five-corps army, then under the command of Major General George B. McClellan. The first commander of the corps was Major General Irvin McDowell. It contained three divisions under the commands of Brigadier Generals William B. Franklin, George A. McCall, and Rufus King.

McClellan originally intended for the I Corps to participate in his Peninsula Campaign with the rest of the army, but after Stonewall Jackson initiated his Valley Campaign on March 23 at the First Battle of Kernstown, President Lincoln decided to keep the corps in northern Virginia to protect Washington.

On April 4, Lincoln created the Department of the Rappahannock, detaching the I Corps from the Army of the Potomac to form the core of the new department, and giving command of the department to I Corps commander, Irvin McDowell.

In May, Franklin’s division was detached and sent south to reinforce McClellan in his Peninsula campaign, uniting with a division of the IV Corps to form the VI Corps.

On June 18, McCall’s division, the “Pennsylvania Reserves”, was also detached and sent to join McClellan’s army on the Virginia Peninsula. Temporarily attached to the V Corps, it saw heavy action at Gaines' Mill and Glendale. Division commander Brig. Gen. George McCall and future I Corps commander Brig. Gen. John Reynolds were both captured and freed in a prisoner exchange that August.

On June 26, Rufus King’s division, James B. Ricketts’ division, and Abner Doubleday’s brigade were transferred from the Department of the Rappahannock to the newly created Army of Virginia, forming its III Corps, under the command of Irvin McDowell.

On August 26, the “Pennsylvania Reserves” were transferred to the III Corps of the Army of Virginia and fought at the Second Battle of Bull Run. Soon after the battle, the corps was transferred to the Army of the Potomac and reclassified as the I Corps of the Army of the Potomac.

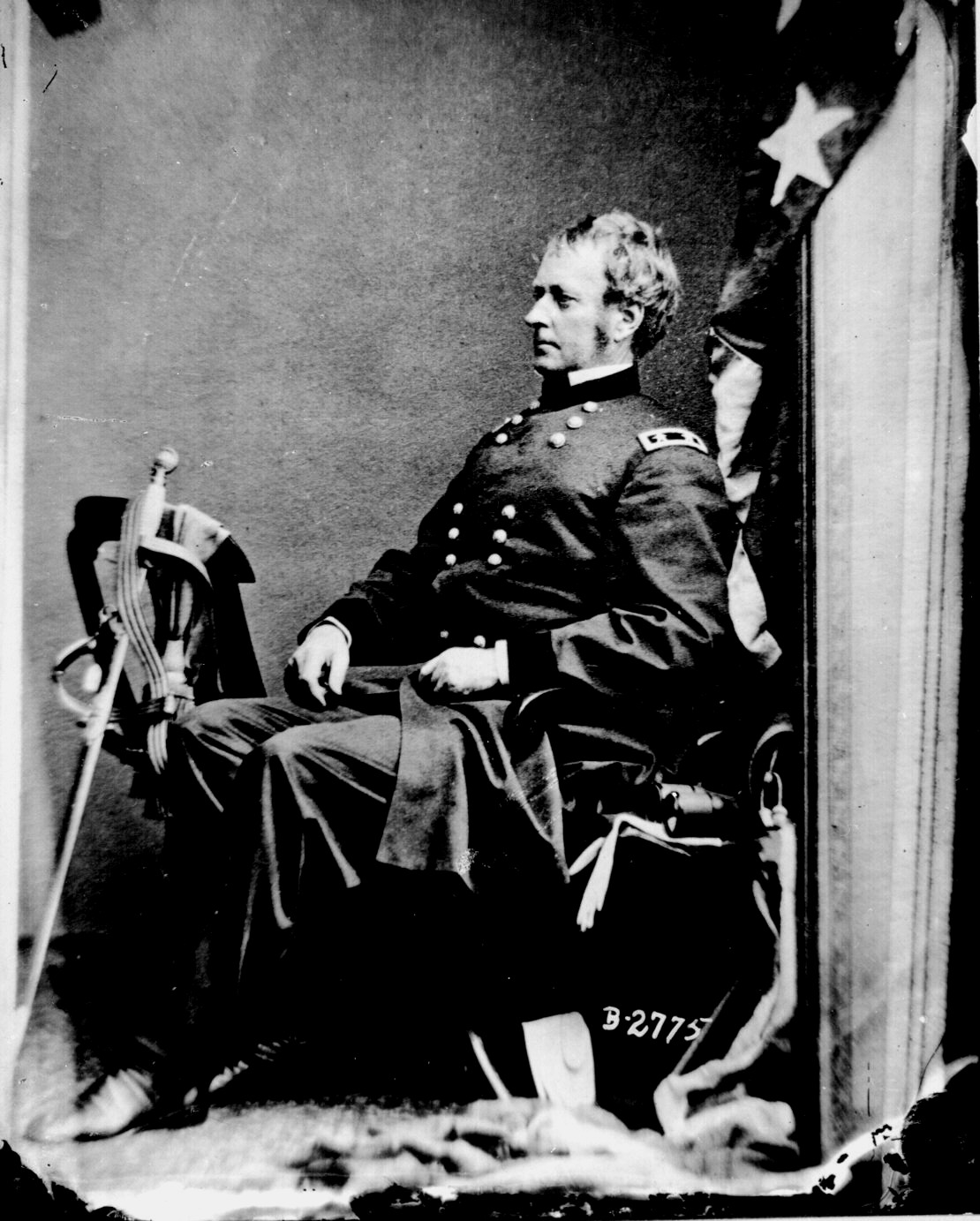
Maj. Gen. Joseph Hooker

In early September, the I Corps, now under the command of Major General Joseph Hooker, followed Lee through Maryland and fought at South Mountain and Antietam. John Reynolds (who had been elevated to division command of the Reserves) was temporarily detached to train militia troops in his home state of Pennsylvania and did not participate in the Maryland Campaign. At Antietam, the I Corps was the first corps engaged, and suffered enormous losses in the fighting around the cornfield and Dunker Church. Hooker was wounded in the foot during the battle and command of the I Corps devolved on George Meade (the ranking division commander). In October, Reynolds returned and was made commander of the corps.

Having fought three battles in six weeks, the I Corps was severely depleted. An influx of new volunteer regiments (both three year and nine month) arrived to replenish its ranks, and by November it was back up to full strength.

The corps moved southward to fight General Robert E. Lee's army at the Battle of Fredericksburg, commanded by Major General John F. Reynolds, arguably the best Union corps commander in the Eastern Theater. At Fredericksburg, Meade and John Gibbon's divisions fought Stonewall Jackson's corps south of the town while Doubleday's division was held in reserve. The I Corps did not see any significant action in the Chancellorsville Campaign.

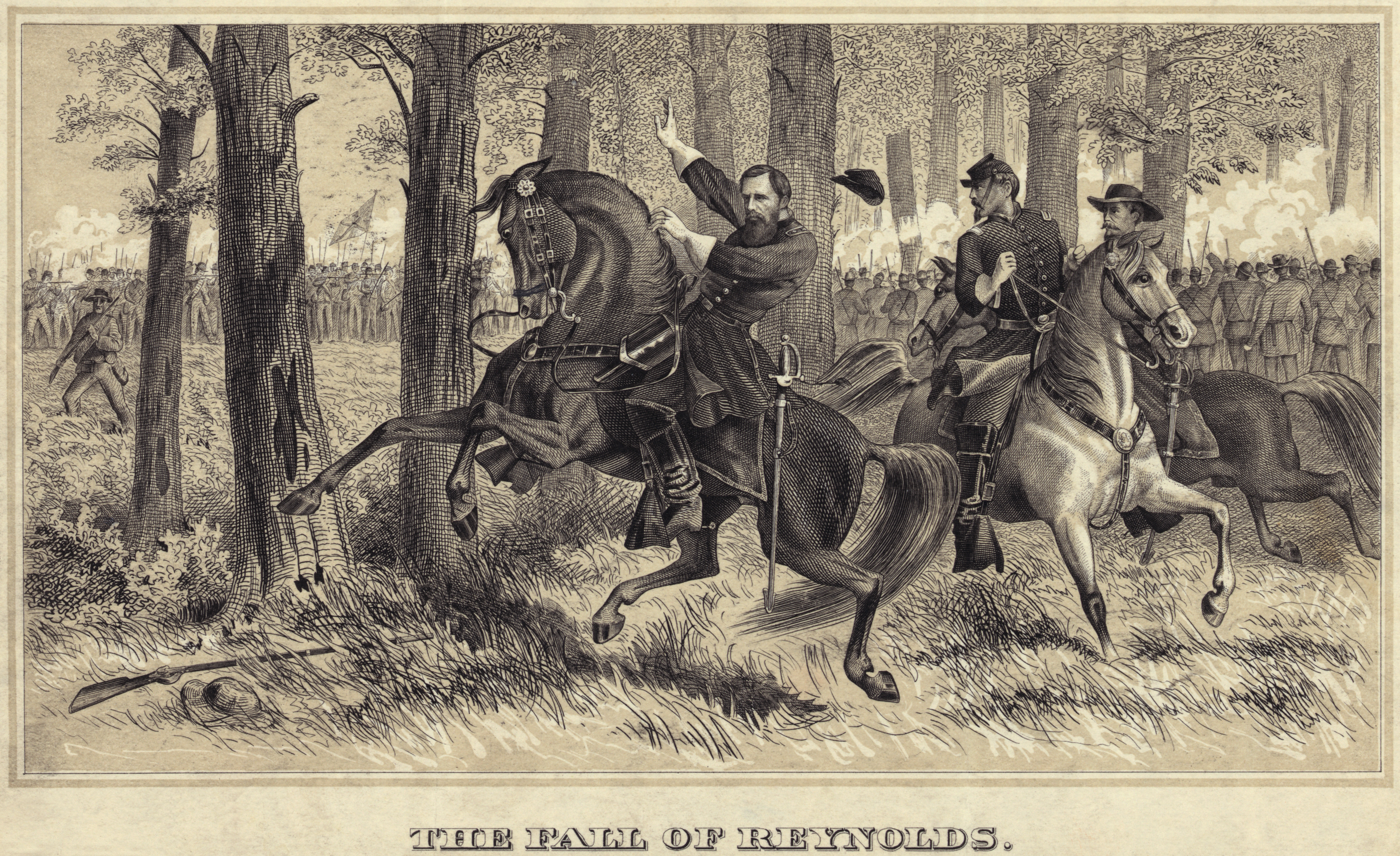
"The Fall of Reynolds" – drawing of Reynolds' death at Gettysburg

In its last major battle, the Battle of Gettysburg, General Reynolds was killed just as the first troops arrived on the field, and command was inherited by Major General Abner Doubleday. Although putting up a ferocious fight, the I Corps was overwhelmed by the Confederate Third Corps (A.P. Hill) and Robert E. Rodes's division of Richard S. Ewell's Second Corps. It was forced to retreat through the town of Gettysburg, taking up defensive positions on Cemetery Hill after the 16th Maine's brave stand of which only 39 soldiers returned. The next day (July 2, 1863), the command was given to Major General John Newton, a division commander from the VI Corps. This was a controversial move that deeply offended the more senior Doubleday. Newton led it through the remainder of the battle, including the defense against Pickett's Charge, and through the Mine Run Campaign that fall.

On March 24, 1864, the Civil War career of the I Corps came to an end as it was disbanded and its depleted units were reorganized into two divisions, which were transferred into the V Corps of the Army of the Potomac.

== Command history ==
Irvin McDowell	March 13, 1862 – April 4, 1862
Irvin McDowell*	June 26, 1862 – September 5, 1862
James B. Ricketts*	September 5, 1862 – September 6, 1862
Joseph Hooker*	September 6, 1862 – September 12, 1862
Joseph Hooker	September 12, 1862 – September 17, 1862
George G. Meade	September 17, 1862 – September 29, 1862
John F. Reynolds	September 29, 1862 – January 2, 1863
James S. Wadsworth	January 2, 1863 – January 4, 1863
John F. Reynolds	January 4, 1863 – March 1, 1863
James S. Wadsworth	March 1, 1863 – March 9, 1863
John F. Reynolds	March 9, 1863 – July 1, 1863
Abner Doubleday	July 1, 1863 – July 2, 1863
John Newton	July 2, 1863 – March 12, 1864
James S. Wadsworth	March 12, 1864 – March 14, 1864
John Newton	March 14, 1864 – March 24, 1864

* As III Corps, Army of Virginia
