= Franz Sigel =

German-born American military officer (1824–1902)

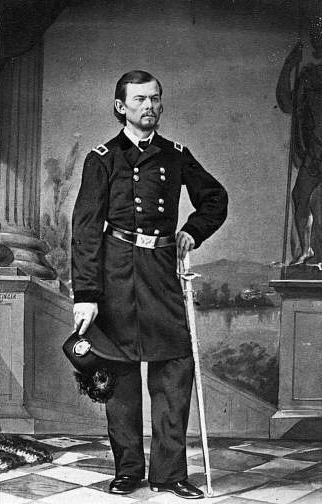
- Franz Sigel
- Born: November 18, 1824; Sinsheim, Baden, German Confederation
- Died: August 21, 1902 (aged 77); New York City, New York, U.S.
- Burial place: Woodlawn Cemetery, The Bronx, New York
- Military career
- Allegiance: Grand Duchy of Baden; Baden Revolutionaries; United States
- Branch: Baden Army; Baden Revolutionary Forces; Union army
- Service years: 1843–1847 (Baden); 1848 (Revolutionaries); 1861–1865 (USA)
- Rank: Lieutenant (Baden); Colonel (Baden Revolutionaries); Major General (USA)
- Commands: XI Corps
- Conflicts: Baden Revolution; American Civil War; Battle of Carthage (1861); Battle of Wilson's Creek; Battle of Pea Ridge; Second Battle of Bull Run; Battle of New Market

Signature
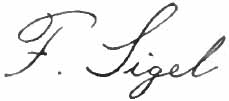

Franz Sigel (November 18, 1824 – August 21, 1902) was a German-born American military officer and revolutionary who immigrated to the United States where he worked as a teacher, newspaperman, and politician along with serving as a major general in the Union army during the American Civil War. His ability to recruit German-speaking immigrants to the Union armies received the approval of President Abraham Lincoln, but he was strongly disliked by General-in-Chief Henry Halleck.

== Early life ==
Sigel was born in Sinsheim, Baden (Germany), and attended the gymnasium in Bruchsal. He graduated from Karlsruhe Military Academy in 1843, and was commissioned as a lieutenant in the army of the Grand Duchy of Baden. He met the revolutionaries Friedrich Hecker and Gustav von Struve and became associated with the revolutionary movement. He was wounded in a duel in 1847. The same year, he retired from the army to begin law school studies in Heidelberg.

After organizing a revolutionary free corps in Mannheim and later in the Seekreis county, he soon became a leader of the Baden revolutionary forces (with the rank of colonel) in the 1848 revolution, being one of the few revolutionaries with military command experience. In April 1848, he led the "Sigel-Zug", recruiting a militia of more than 4,000 volunteers to lead a siege against the city of Freiburg. His militia was defeated on April 23, 1848 by the numerically inferior but better led troops of the Grand Duchy of Baden.

In 1849, he became Secretary of War and commander-in-chief of the revolutionary republican government of Baden. Wounded in a skirmish, Sigel had to resign his command but continued to support the revolutionary war effort as adjutant general to his successor Ludwik Mieroslawski. In July, after the defeat of the revolutionaries by Prussian troops and Mieroslawski's departure, Sigel led the retreat of the remaining troops in their flight to Switzerland. Sigel later went on to England. Sigel immigrated to the United States in 1852, as did many other German Forty-Eighters.

Sigel taught in the New York City public schools and served in the state militia. He married a daughter of Rudolf Dulon and taught in Dulon's school. In 1857, he became a professor at the German-American Institute in St. Louis, Missouri. He was elected director of the St. Louis public schools in 1860. He was influential in the Missouri immigrant community. He attracted Germans to the Union side and antislavery causes when he openly supported them in 1861.

== American Civil War ==
Shortly after the start of the war, Sigel was commissioned colonel of the 3rd Missouri Infantry, a commission dating from 4 May 1861. He took part in the capture of Camp Jackson in St. Louis by Brig. Gen Nathaniel Lyon on 10 May.

In the summer of 1861, President Lincoln actively sought the support of antislavery, pro-Unionist immigrants. Sigel, always popular with the German immigrants, was a good candidate to advance this plan. He was promoted to brigadier general on 7 August, to rank from 17 May, one of a number of early politician-generals elevated by Lincoln.

In June, Sigel led a Federal column to Springfield in southwest Missouri. He then moved to Carthage, to cut off the retreat of pro-Confederate Missouri State Guard troops previously defeated by Lyon at Boonville.

In the subsequent Battle of Carthage on 5 July, Sigel's outnumbered force was driven back by the State Guard. The action was strategically insignificant, but did encourage pro-Confederate recruitment.

Sigel then joined his troops with the army under Lyon, which marched to Springfield in pursuit of the State Guard. In the Battle of Wilson's Creek, on 10 August, he led a flanking column which attacked the rear of the rebel force, but was routed. After General Lyon was killed, Sigel assumed command of the army, and conducted the retreat to Rolla.

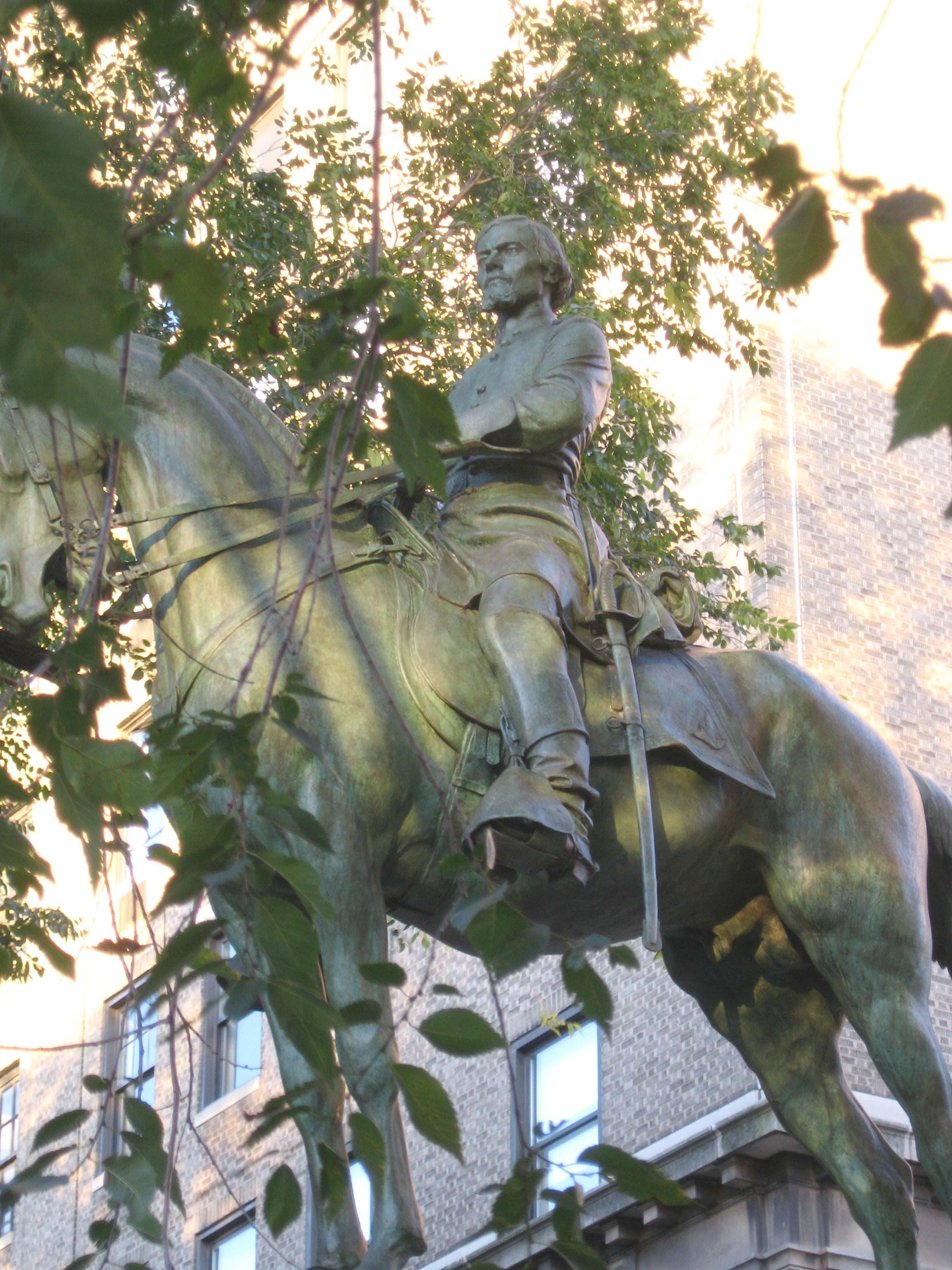
Riverside Drive, New York City

In early 1862, Sigel was given command of two divisions of the Army of the Southwest under Samuel R. Curtis. The army moved through Springfield into Arkansas, and met Confederate troops under Maj. Gen. Earl Van Dorn in the Battle of Pea Ridge on 8–9 March. Sigel's finest performance was in this battle. His troops fought well, and on 9 March he personally directed the Union artillery in the attack which routed the Confederates.

Sigel was promoted to major general on 21 March 1862. He served as a division commander in the Shenandoah Valley and fought unsuccessfully against Maj. Gen. Thomas J. "Stonewall" Jackson, who outwitted and defeated the larger Union force in a number of small engagements. He commanded the I Corps in Maj. Gen. John Pope's Army of Virginia at the Second Battle of Bull Run, another Union defeat, where he was wounded in the hand.

Over the winter of 1862–63, Sigel commanded the XI Corps, consisting primarily of German immigrant soldiers, in the Army of the Potomac. When Ambrose Burnside assumed command of the Army of the Potomac, he instituted 'grand divisions', consisting of two corps each; Sigel assumed command of the Reserve Grand Division, consisting of the XI and XII Corps. The Reserve Grand Division saw no action; it stayed in reserve during the Battle of Fredericksburg. After the battle, and the dissolution of the grand divisions, Sigel returned to command of the XI Corps. He had developed a reputation as an inept general, but his ability to recruit and motivate German immigrants kept him employed in a politically sensitive position. Many of these soldiers could speak little English beyond "I'm going to fight mit Sigel", which was their proud slogan and about which the song I Goes to Fight mit Sigel was written.

General Sigels Grand March sheet music cover in 1861

They were quite disgruntled when Sigel left the XI Corps in February 1863, and was replaced by Major-General Oliver O. Howard, who had no immigrant affinities. Fortunately for Sigel, the two black marks in the XI Corps' reputation—Chancellorsville and Gettysburg—occurred after he was relieved.

The reason for Sigel's relief is unclear. Some accounts cite failing health; others that he expressed his displeasure at the small size of his corps and asked to be relieved. Many historians also cite the lack of military prowess and skill. On multiple occasions, he made terrible military decisions, resulting in deaths of his soldiers. General-in-chief Henry W. Halleck detested Sigel, and managed to keep him relegated to light duty in eastern Pennsylvania until March 1864. President Lincoln, for political reasons, directed Secretary of War Edwin M. Stanton to place Sigel in command of the new Department of West Virginia.

In his new command, Sigel opened the Valley Campaigns of 1864, launching an invasion of the Shenandoah Valley. He was soundly defeated by Maj. Gen. John C. Breckinridge at the Battle of New Market, on May 15, 1864, which was particularly embarrassing due to the prominent role played by young cadets from the Virginia Military Institute. After the battle, Sigel was replaced by Maj. Gen. David Hunter. In July, Sigel fought Lt. Gen. Jubal A. Early at Harpers Ferry, but soon afterward was replaced by Albion P. Howe.

Sigel spent the rest of the war without an active command.

== Postbellum career ==
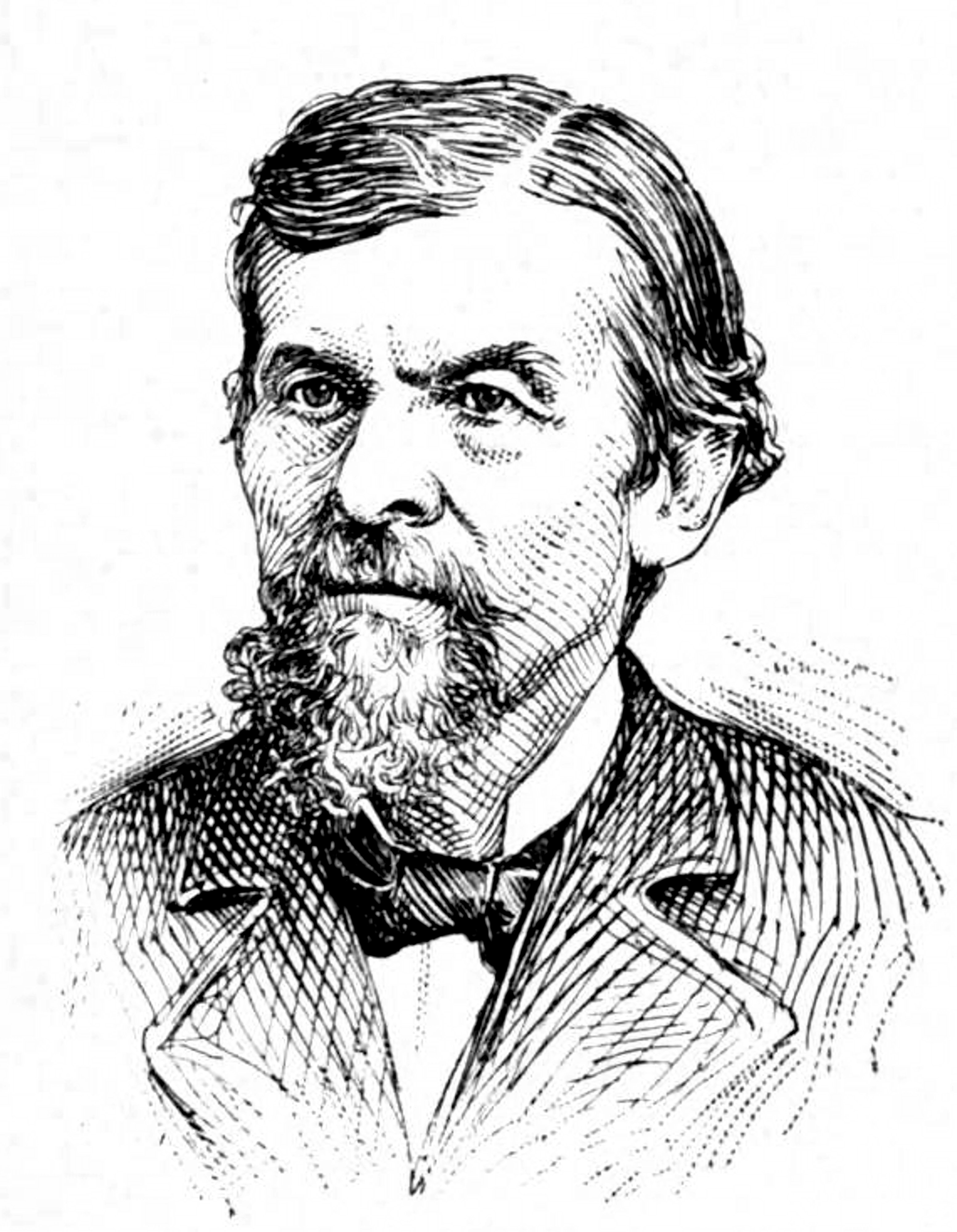
Portrait from Appleton's Cyclopedia

Sigel resigned his commission on May 4, 1865. He worked as editor of the Baltimore Wecker for a short time, and then as a newspaper editor in New York City. He filled a variety of political positions there, both as a Democrat and a Republican. In 1869, he ran on the Republican ticket for Secretary of State of New York, losing to the incumbent Democrat Homer Augustus Nelson. In May 1871 he became collector of internal revenue, and then in October 1871 register of the city. In 1887, President Grover Cleveland appointed him pension agent for the city of New York. He also lectured, worked in advertising and published the New York Monthly, a German-American periodical, for some years.

Franz Sigel died in New York in 1902 and is buried in Woodlawn Cemetery in The Bronx, New York City. His granddaughter, Elsie Sigel, was the victim of a notorious murder.

== Honors ==
Statues of him stand in Riverside Park, corner 106th Street in Manhattan and in Forest Park in St. Louis, Missouri. There is also a park named for him in the Bronx, just south of the Courthouse near Yankee Stadium. Seigel Street in Williamsburg, Brooklyn was named after him, Sigel Street in Worcester, Massachusetts was also named after him, as well as the village of Sigel, Pennsylvania, founded in 1865, in addition to Sigel, Illinois, which was settled in 1863. Sigel Township, Minnesota, settled in 1856 and organized in April 1862, was also named for Sigel. There is a street named after him on the western campus of the National Geospatial-Intelligence Agency in St. Louis (which is located on the grounds of the former St. Louis Arsenal). In about 1873 Sigel himself visited Sigel Township and New Ulm, Minnesota.

== See also ==
- List of American Civil War generals (Union)
- German Americans in the Civil War

== Notes ==
Military offices
Preceded by none	Commander of the XI Corps; September 12, 1862 – January 10, 1863	Succeeded by Julius H. Stahel
Preceded by Carl Schurz	Commander of the XI Corps; February 5, 1863 – February 22, 1863	Succeeded by Adolph von Steinwehr
