= Louis Blenker =

German revolutionary and American soldier

Louis (Ludwig) Blenker
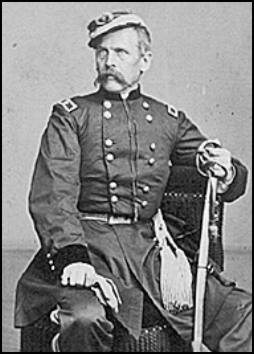
- General Louis (Ludwig) Blenker
- Born: July 31, 1812; Worms, Germany
- Died: October 31, 1863 (aged 51); Rockland County, New York
- Burial place: Rockland Cemetery, Sparkill, New York
- Military career
- Allegiance: Bavaria; United States of America
- Branch: Bavarian Army; United States Army; Union Army
- Service years: 1832–1837; 1861–1863
- Rank: Brigadier general (USA)
- Conflicts: American Civil War

Signature
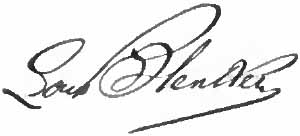

Louis Blenker (July 31, 1812 – October 31, 1863) was a German revolutionary and American soldier.

== Life in Germany ==
He was born at Worms, Germany. After being trained as a goldsmith by an uncle in Kreuznach, he was sent to a polytechnical school in Munich. Against his family's wishes, he enlisted in an Uhlan regiment which accompanied Otto to Greece in 1832. Due to his gallantry, he soon became an officer. A revolt in Greece obligated him to leave, with an honorable discharge, in 1837.

He studied medicine in Munich and then, at the wish of his parents, opened a wine trading business in Worms. In 1843, he married Elise Blenker. In 1848, he became a colonel in the Worms militia. A large majority of the citizens also preferred him for mayor of Worms, but the otherwise liberal Jaup ministry failed to confirm him due to intrigues by the opposition party. This drove him into the hands of the German Revolutionary party of 1848, and when the revolution broke out in Baden, he led an insurgent corps in spite of the poor prospects.

He was noted on both sides for his fearlessness. His wife, Elise, accompanied him on his campaigns. As commander of the Freischaren (Free Corps), he took Ludwigshafen (May 10, 1849), occupied the city of Worms, and made an unsuccessful attack on Landau. When the Prussian troops entered the Electorate of the Palatinate, he fought in several of the engagements in Baden, but after the suppression of the revolution was compelled to flee with other leading revolutionaries like Germain Metternich, Ludwig Bamberger, and Franz Zitz to Switzerland, whence he emigrated to the United States.

== Life in the United States ==
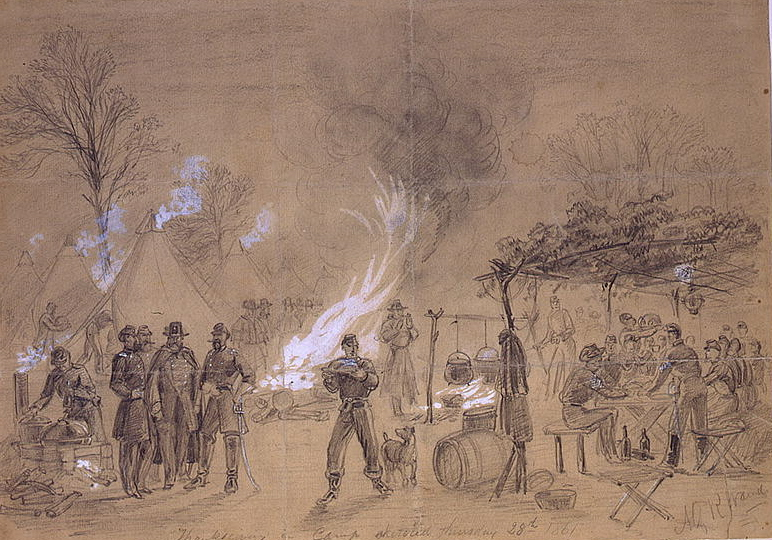
Thanksgiving in the camp of General Louis Blenker

On his arrival in the United States, he settled on a farm in New York, and ran a small business. Upon the outbreak of the Civil War he organized the 8th New York Volunteer Infantry Regiment, of which he became colonel. He was noted for his coverage of the retreat at Bull Run and for his performance in western Virginia at the Battle of Cross Keys. For his gallantry at Bull Run he was raised to the rank of brigadier general of volunteers.

But after Cross Keys a series of deficiencies plagued his command, the main accusation being carelessness with respect to supplies. There were also allegations of financial irregularities. In a letter to the Illinois Staatszeitung, Gustav Struve defended Blenker on this score, i.e. with regard to a charge that he got $100 a month from each of the sutlers he had licensed to service his troops. But the charges persisted. Stories appeared in the German-language press and the New York Tribune accusing Blenker's troops of looting the countryside of edibles and theft of items of no military worth. Blenker was defended by the New Yorker Criminal Zeitung und Belletristisches Journal, and some editors suggested that Carl Schurz was planning to supersede Blenker.

Blenker had a love of pomp. When McClellan became general of the Army of the Potomac, Blenker led a procession to his headquarters. Yet there were credible testimonials to his organizational ability, and no one questioned his courage. However, his command became notable for the quantities of foreign nobility in its ranks, the climax coming when Prince Felix Salm-Salm joined his ranks, an affront to republicans like Karl Heinzen and Struve. Struve, also a member of Blenker's corps, resigned, and Heinzen broadcast protests in his newspaper, the Pionier.

The allegations reached the War Department, and when his appointment as a general reached the Senate for confirmation several senators repeated them: questionable finances, command hierarchies and distinctions more appropriate to Europe than to the United States, exploitation of his troops through the sutlers. Alexander Schimmelfennig, a fellow officer, referred to him as a "bum," and there was much controversy between supporters of Schurz, Blenker and Franz Sigel. Blenker was ultimately confirmed as a general, but his career was ruined.

Soon he was superseded by Sigel. He was mustered out of service March 31, 1863, and died in October of injuries sustained while with his command at Warrenton, Virginia, leaving behind his wife, son and three daughters in dire circumstances. Blenker died in poverty and there was no proof he profited from the sutlers' trade. Some members of his staff were convicted for financial irregularities however. McClellan continued to esteem him as an officer.

== See also ==
- List of American Civil War generals (Union)
