= Army of Virginia =

- Active: June 26, 1862 – September 12, 1862
- Country: United States of America
- Branch: United States Army
- Type: Field Army
- Size: 50,000-100,000 peak
- Engagements: Battle of Cedar Mountain; Second Battle of Bull Run

Commanders
- Notable commanders: Maj. Gen. John Pope

The Army of Virginia was organized as a major unit of the Union Army and operated briefly and unsuccessfully in 1862 in the American Civil War. It should not be confused with its principal opponent, the Confederate Army of Northern Virginia, commanded by Robert E. Lee.

== History ==
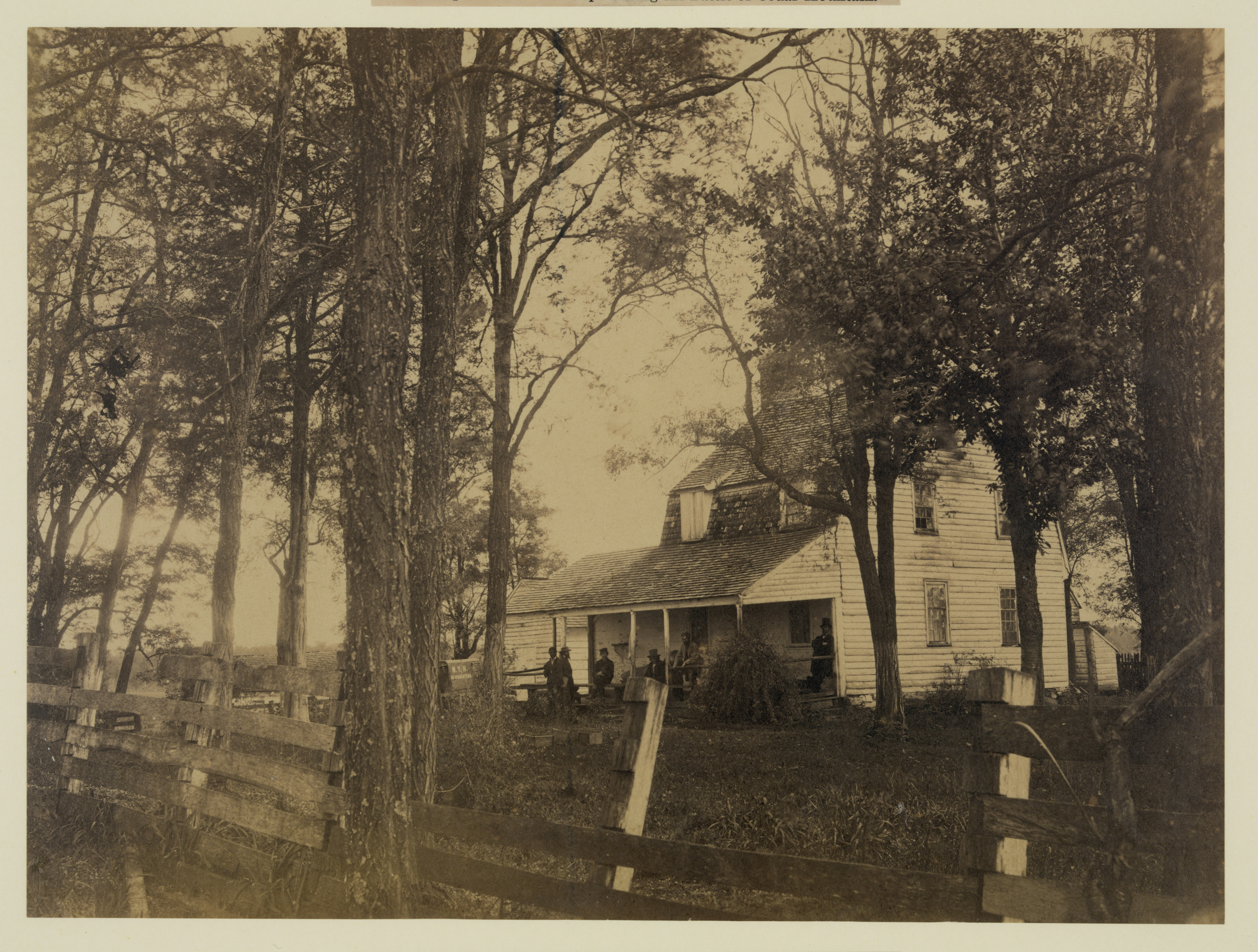
Gen. Pope's headquarters during the battle of Cedar Mountain

The Army of Virginia was constituted on June 26, 1862, by General Orders Number 103, from four existing departments operating around Virginia: Maj. Gen. John C. Frémont's Mountain Department, Maj. Gen. Irvin McDowell's Department of the Rappahannock, Maj. Gen. Nathaniel P. Banks's Department of the Shenandoah, and Brig. Gen. Samuel D. Sturgis's brigade from the Military District of Washington. Maj. Gen. John Pope commanded the new organization, which was divided into three corps of over 50,000 men. Three corps of Maj. Gen. George B. McClellan's Army of the Potomac later were added for combat operations.

Radical Republicans in Congress and the Cabinet saw the Army of Virginia as taking the lead in widening the goals of the war. The senior officers of the Army were stronger advocates of the abolition of slavery and the southern way of life and had a smaller proportion of West Point graduates than the contemporary Army of the Potomac.

Banks's corps of the Army of Virginia fought against Stonewall Jackson at the Battle of Cedar Mountain, gaining initial advantage, but was defeated by a Confederate counterattack led by A.P. Hill.

The entire army was soundly defeated at the Second Battle of Bull Run by Jackson, Longstreet, and Lee, and withdrew to the defensive lines of Washington, D.C. On September 12, 1862, the units of the Army of Virginia were merged into the Army of the Potomac and the Army of Virginia was never reconstituted.

== Commander ==
- Major General John Pope (June 26, 1862 – September 12, 1862)

== Organization ==
The first three corps were given numeric designations that overlapped with those in the Army of the Potomac. They were redesignated as shown for the Maryland Campaign and later.

- I Corps, Army of Virginia; commanded by Franz Sigel (this corps had been the Mountain Department under John Frémont; it eventually became the XI Corps, Army of the Potomac)
- II Corps, Army of Virginia; commanded by Nathaniel Banks (formerly known as V Corps and Department of the Shenandoah; later known as XII Corps, Army of the Potomac)
- III Corps, Army of Virginia; commanded by Irvin McDowell (formerly known as I Corps and Department of the Rappahannock; reverted to I Corps, Army of the Potomac)
- Cavalry Brigade, commanded by George Bayard

The following corps were attached for operations during the Northern Virginia Campaign:

- III Corps, Army of the Potomac; commanded by Samuel P. Heintzelman
- V Corps, Army of the Potomac; commanded by Fitz John Porter
- IX Corps, Army of the Potomac; commanded by Jesse L. Reno
- Reynolds's Division, commanded by John F. Reynolds (the Pennsylvania Reserves)

== Major battles ==
- Battle of Cedar Mountain – Pope (Only Banks's II Corps was involved in the fighting)
- Second Battle of Bull Run – Pope
- Battle of Chantilly – Pope (although fought mostly by Army of the Potomac troops, elements of Pope's force were engaged)
