= Army of the Potomac =

Principal Union army in the eastern theatre of the American Civil War

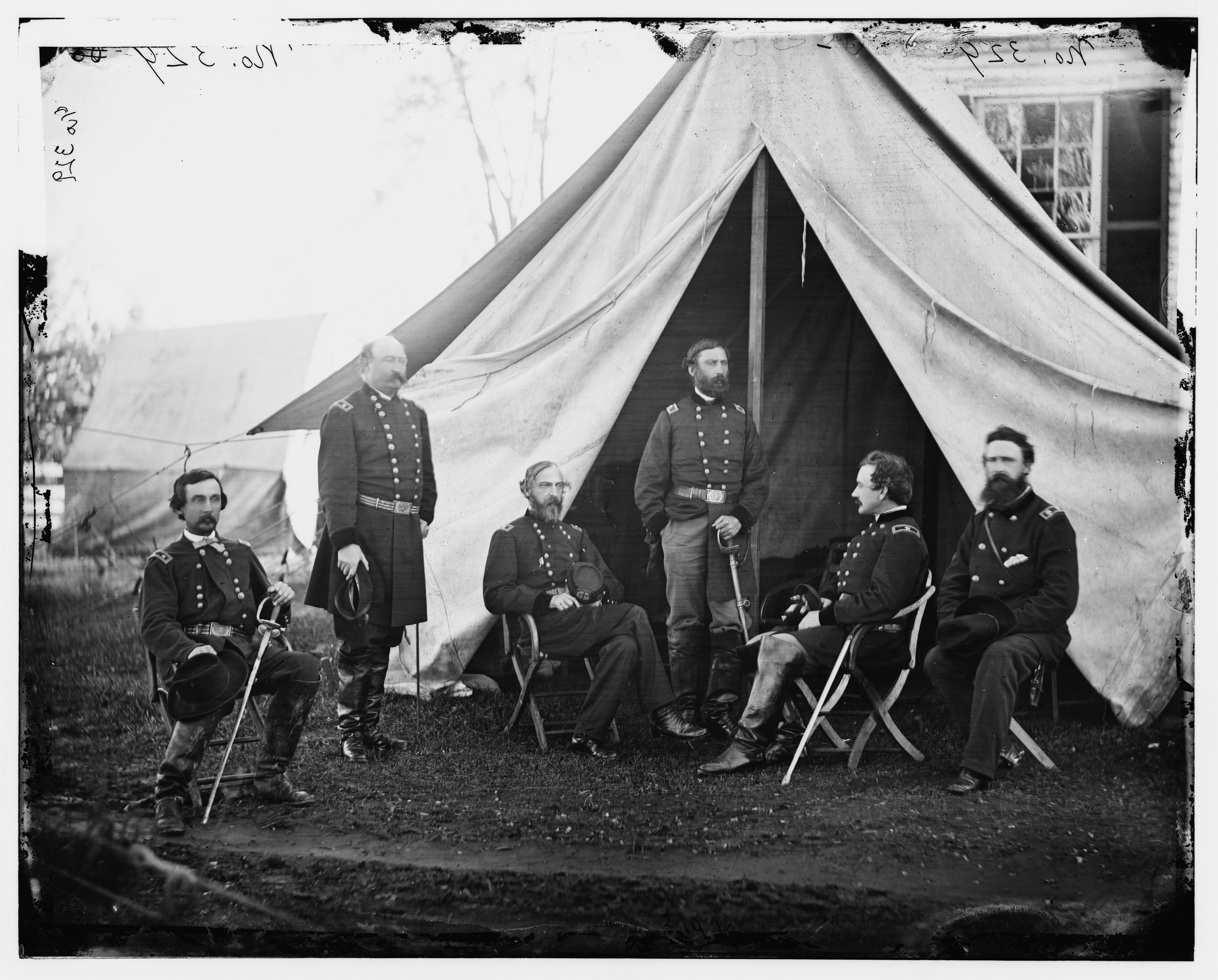
- Generals of the Army of the Potomac at Culpeper, Virginia in September 1863, including (from left to right): Gouverneur K. Warren, William H. French, George G. Meade, Henry J. Hunt, Andrew A. Humphreys, and George Sykes
- Founded: 1861–1865
- Disbanded: June 28, 1865
- Country: United States
- Branch: United States Army
- Type: Field army
- Role: Primary Union Army in Eastern Theater
- Part of: Union Army
- Garrison/HQ: Washington, D.C., U.S.
- Engagements: American Civil War: Battle of Gettysburg; Battle of Spotsylvania

Commanders
- Notable commanders: Irvin McDowell; George B. McClellan; Ambrose Burnside; Joseph Hooker; George G. Meade

The Army of the Potomac was the primary field army of the Union army in the eastern theater of the American Civil War. It was created in July 1861 shortly after the First Battle of Bull Run and was disbanded in June 1865 following the surrender of the Confederate Army of Northern Virginia in April.

== History ==
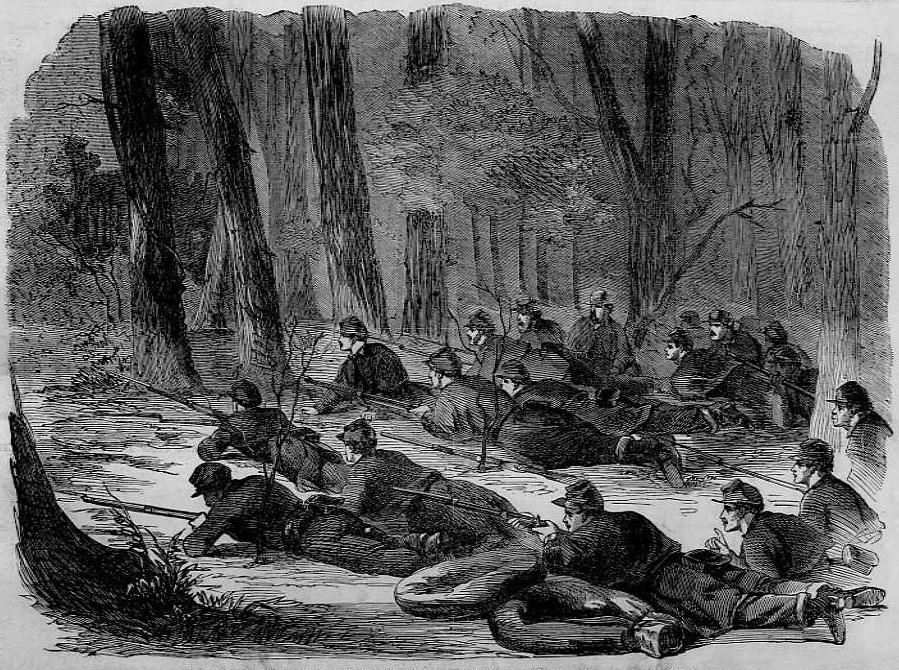
The Army of the Potomac – Our Outlying Picket in the Woods, an illustration of the Army of the Potomac by Winslow Homer published in Harper's Weekly on June 7, 1862

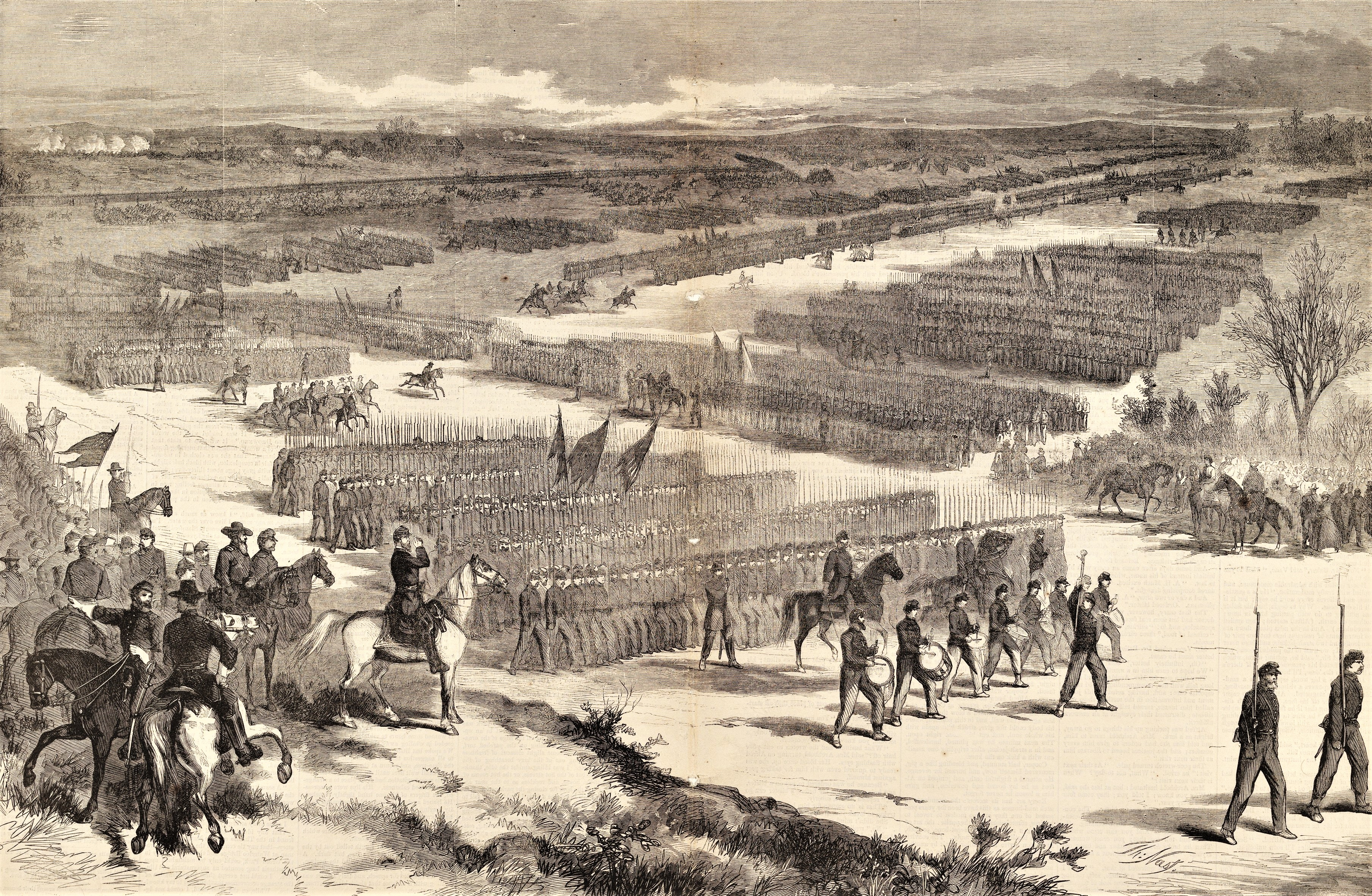
Grand Review of the Army of the Potomac, an October 1863 illustration by Thomas Nast in Harper's Weekly

The Army of the Potomac was founded in 1861. It initially was only the size of a corps relative to the size of Union armies later in the Civil War. Its nucleus was called the Army of Northeastern Virginia led by Brig. Gen. Irvin McDowell. It fought and lost the Civil War's first major battle, the First Battle of Bull Run. The arrival in Washington, D.C., of Maj. Gen. George B. McClellan dramatically changed the makeup of that army. McClellan's original assignment was to command the Division of the Potomac, which included the Department of Northeast Virginia under McDowell and the Department of Washington under Brig. Gen. Joseph K. Mansfield.

On July 26, 1861, the Department of the Shenandoah, commanded by Maj. Gen. Nathaniel P. Banks, was merged with McClellan's departments and on that day, McClellan formed the Army of the Potomac, which was composed of all military forces in the former Departments of Northeastern Virginia, Washington, Pennsylvania, and the Shenandoah. The men under Banks's command became an infantry division in the Army of the Potomac. The army started with four corps, but these were divided during the Peninsula campaign to produce two more. After the Second Battle of Bull Run, the Army of the Potomac absorbed the units that had served under Maj. Gen. John Pope.

The belief that John Pope commanded the Army of the Potomac in the summer of 1862 after McClellan's unsuccessful Peninsula campaign is mistaken. On the contrary, Pope's Army of Virginia was built around different units, although three corps of the Army of the Potomac were sent to northern Virginia and were under Pope's operational control during the Northern Virginia campaign. During the time that the Army of Virginia existed, the Army of the Potomac was headquartered on the Virginia Peninsula, and then outside Washington, D.C., with McClellan still in command, although most of his troops had been temporarily reassigned. After Pope's defeat at Second Bull Run, McClellan was given back his original units, plus most of the units of the Army of Virginia, which were integrated into the Army of the Potomac – although not always successfully.

The Army of the Potomac underwent many structural changes during its existence. The army was divided by Ambrose Burnside into three grand divisions of two corps each with a Reserve composed of two more. Hooker abolished the grand divisions. Thereafter the individual corps, seven of which remained in Virginia, reported directly to army headquarters. Hooker also created a Cavalry Corps by combining units that previously had served as smaller formations. In late 1863, two corps were sent West, and – in 1864 – the remaining five corps were recombined into three. Burnside's IX Corps, which accompanied the army at the start of Ulysses S. Grant's Overland Campaign, rejoined the army later. For more detail, see the section Corps below.

The Army of the Potomac fought in most of the Eastern Theater campaigns, primarily in (Eastern) Virginia, Maryland, and Pennsylvania. After the end of the war, it was disbanded on June 28, 1865, shortly following its participation in the Grand Review of the Armies.

The Army of the Potomac was also the name given to General P. G. T. Beauregard's Confederate army during the early stages of the war (namely, First Bull Run; thus, the losing Union army ended up adopting the name of the winning Confederate army). However, the name was eventually changed to the Army of Northern Virginia, which became famous under General Robert E. Lee.

In 1869, the Society of the Army of the Potomac was formed as a veterans association. It had its last reunion in 1927.

The Army of the Potomac was a Union regiment used throughout the Eastern Theater of the American Civil War. Though their military achievement throughout the Eastern Theater can be attributed to capable Union leadership, the Army of the Potomac, particularly the army's average infantrymen, contributed much to the Union's military success and political realignment, as the war's motivation shifted towards ending slavery.

Soldiers and their Political Stance

Like most regiments in the Union Army, the Army of the Potomac was made up of individual soldiers from various social and political backgrounds, each contributing to the army's performance and legacy. The army recruited soldiers from Northern cities such as New York City, Philadelphia, and New Jersey, pulling soldiers from both native and foreign-born populations such as the Irish immigrant population which had risen significantly in the U.S. throughout the mid 19th century. Along with their diverse origins, the soldiers of the Potomac Army came from various political backgrounds and shared differing beliefs on the war's objectives and political stance, with the army shifting allegiances between the Copperhead Democrats and Republicans throughout the war.

As the American Civil War progressed, political tensions among army generals and officers became common, with complaints over McClellan's affiliation with the Copperhead movements drawing criticism from lower officers. Capt. Henry Nicholas Blake of the 11th Massachusetts in the Third Corps drew considerable complaints over the regiments of transfer into the Second Corps, with US historian Zachery Fry describing it as a haven for Democratic officers loyal to General McClellan. These comments eventually landed Blake a court-martial, with other officers within the Army of the Potomac receiving similar treatment by high command. Complaints also arose as the influence from West Point and other high-standing institutions waned, with historian George C. Rable highlighting how citizen-officers were coming into their own role as the war continued.

Most low-ranking officers and Union soldiers throughout the war would share similar complaints over the leadership of General McClellan along with other Copperhead Democrats that made up the Army of the Potomac's leadership. This occurred as changes in mindset over the war's desired outcome came into question, whether it was a war to keep the Union together or for the emancipation of slaves in the South, with soldiers attempting to construct a meaning for their contributions to the war effort. According to Hennessy (2014), while many soldiers in the Army of the Potomac grew sympathetic with the goal of emancipation early on, others within the army struggled to reconcile with their own opposition over abolition despite the war shifting towards slavery's end. As the war continued, Union soldiers and some low-ranking officers grew willing to express their feelings over political affairs related to the war's outcome while most high-ranking generals remained silent on these cases.

Soldiers during the Gettysburg and Overland campaign

During the Battle of Gettysburg on July 1, 1863, the Second Corp of the Army of the Potomac were tasked with reinforcing Union lines around Cemetery Hill from Lee's Army, who attempted to extend Union positions and create a breakthrough in the Union's defense. General Gibbons was given temporary command of the Second Corps after their previous commanding officer, General Sickles was wounded during the engagement. The Second Corp, along with support from General Hancock of the Third Corp held their positions against the Confederate advance on Cemetery Hill, with these regiments attempting to patch the Union's defensive lines, with historians such as John H. Matsui citing how these regiments were made up of a mix between veteran soldiers, draftees, along with men who enlisted with the benefit of monetary gain.

As the fighting continued, General Hancock of the Third Corps ran into the 1st Minnesota regiment led by Colonel Colvill, with the remaining regiment numbering around a few hundred strong. Despite their loses over the battle, the men seemed willing to continue the fight against the Confederate assault as General Hancock ordered the regiment to advance on the Confederate Brigade approaching the Union lines. According to Kreiser (2011), the soldiers proved themselves capable of pushing the Confederates back, using the element of surprise as “their advance briefly created a ripple of panic among some of the now halted Confederates.” The 1st Minnesota regiment, followed by support from Union artillery, was successful at halting the Confederate assault on the hill, despite coming at a high human cost.

== Noted units ==
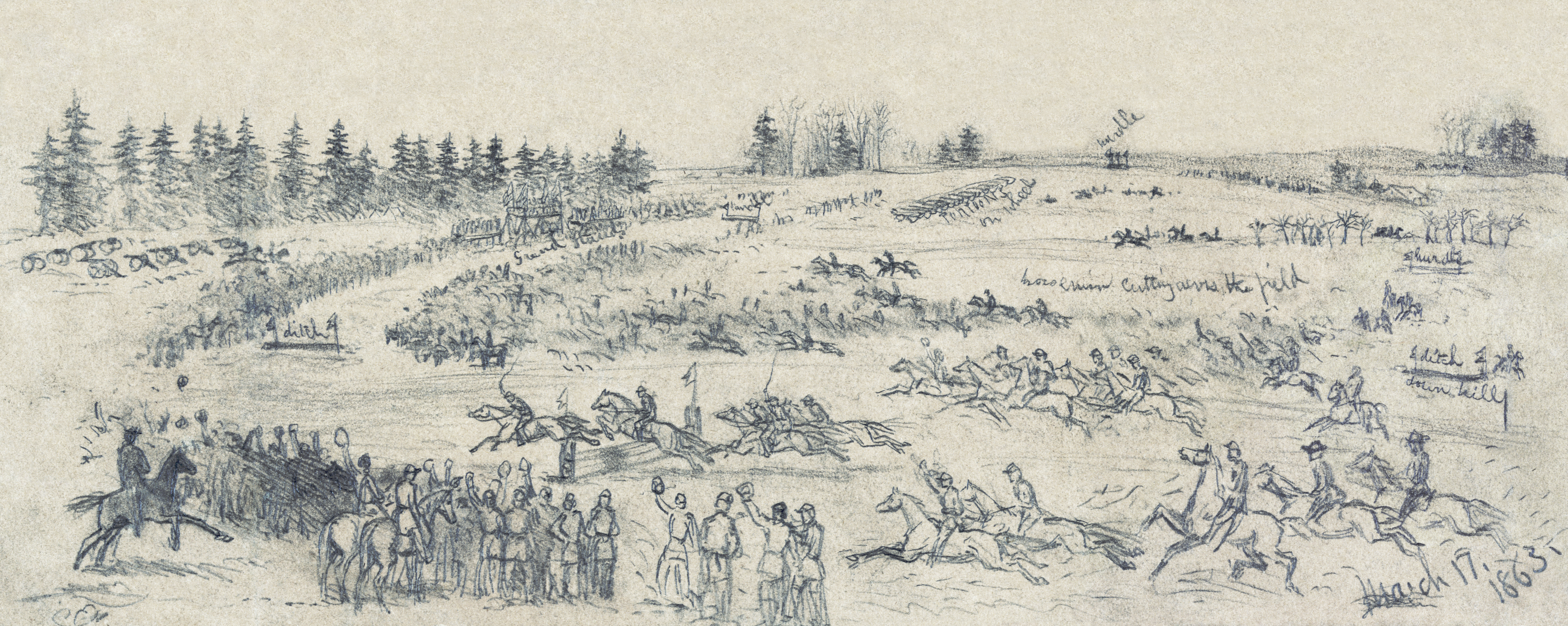
An illustration of the Army of the Potomac celebrating Saint Patrick's Day with a steeplechase race among the Irish Brigade, drawn by Edwin Forbes on March 17, 1863

Because of its proximity to the nation's largest cities at the time, Washington, D.C., Philadelphia, and New York City, the Army of the Potomac received more contemporary media coverage than the other Union field armies. Such coverage produced fame for a number of this army's units. Individual brigades, such as the Irish Brigade, the Philadelphia Brigade, the First New Jersey Brigade, the Vermont Brigade, and the Iron Brigade, were well known to the general public, both during and after the Civil War.

=== Corps ===
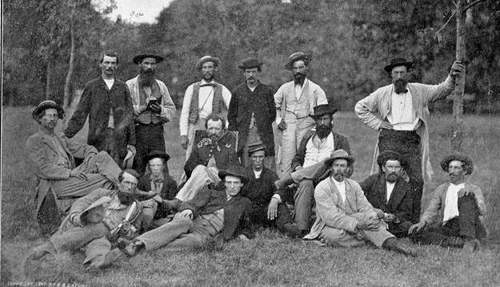
Scouts and guides of the Army of the Potomac, photographed by Mathew Brady

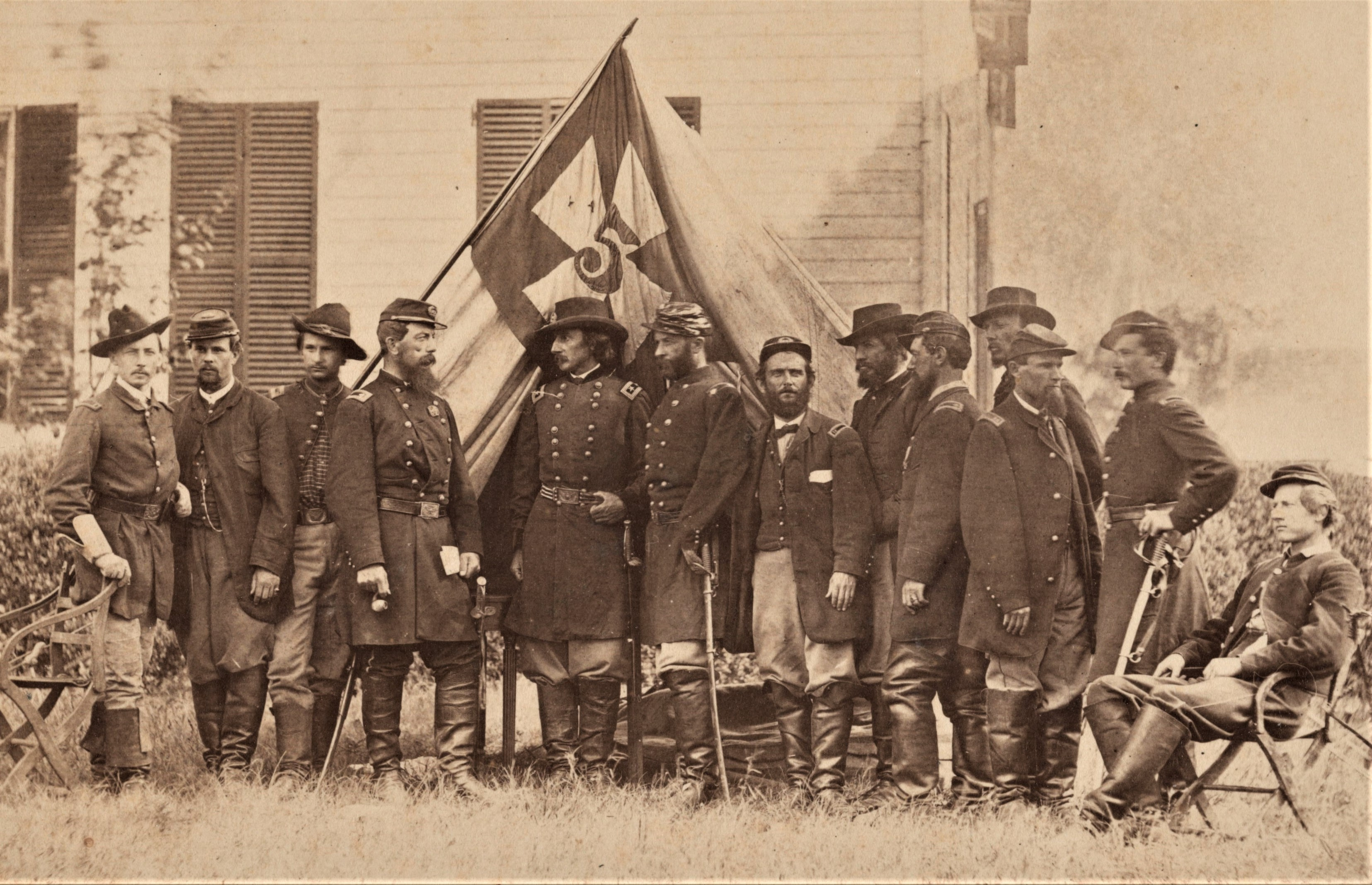
Headquarters staff of the 5th Corps, Army of the Potomac, at the home of Confederate Col. Isaac E. Avery near Petersburg, Virginia, photographed by Matthew Brady in June 1864. Avery was killed on July 3, 1863, at the Battle of Gettysburg.

The army originally consisted of fifteen divisions, the Artillery Reserve and the Cavalry Command. Commanded by Edwin V. Sumner, William B. Franklin, Louis Blenker, Nathaniel P. Banks, Frederick W. Lander (replaced by James Shields after Lander's death on March 2, 1862, Silas Casey, Irvin McDowell, Fitz John Porter, Samuel P. Heintzelman, Don Carlos Buell (replaced by Erasmus D. Keyes in November, 1861), William F. Smith, Joseph Hooker, John A. Dix, Charles P. Stone (replaced by John Sedgwick in February, 1862), George A. McCall, George Stoneman (replaced by Philip St. George Cooke in January, 1862) and Henry J. Hunt.

Because this arrangement would be too hard to control in battle, President Lincoln issued an order on March 13, 1862, dividing the army into five corps headed by MG Irvin McDowell (I Corps; Franklin's Division: BG William B. Franklin, McCall's "Pennsylvania Reserves" Division: BG George A. McCall and McDowell's old Division under BG Rufus King.), BG Edwin V. Sumner (II Corps; Sumner's old Division under BG Israel B. Richardson, Sedgwick's Division: BG John Sedgwick and Blenker's Division: Louis Blenker.), BG Samuel P. Heintzelman (III Corps; Porter's Division: BG Fitz John Porter, Hooker's Division: BG Joseph Hooker and Heintzelman's old Division under BG Charles S. Hamilton), BG Erasmus D. Keyes (IV Corps; Keyes' old Division under BG Darius N. Couch, Smith's Division: BG William F. Smith and Casey's Division: BG Silas Casey), MG Nathaniel P. Banks (V Corps, which later became the XII Corps; Banks' old Division under BG Alpheus S. Williams, Shield's Division: BG James Shields and a Cavalry Division under BG John P. Hatch).

Lincoln named as corps commanders the five highest-ranking division commanders in the army. McClellan was unhappy with this, as he had intended to wait until the army had been tested in battle before judging which generals were suitable for corps command.

After the Battle of Williamsburg on May 5, McClellan requested and obtained permission to create two additions corps; these became the V Corps, headed by BG Fitz-John Porter, and the VI Corps, headed by BG William B. Franklin, both personal favorites of his. After the First Battle of Kernstown in the Valley on March 23, the administration feared the threat to the national capital in Washington, D.C. from "Stonewall" Jackson's force. To McClellan's displeasure, it detached Blenker's division from the II Corps and sent it to West Virginia, where it served under John C. Fremont's command. McDowell's I Corps was detached as well and stationed in the Rappahannock area.

In June 1862, George McCall's division from I Corps (the Pennsylvania Reserves Division) was sent down to the Peninsula and temporarily attached to the V Corps. In the Seven Days Battles, the V Corps was heavily engaged. The Pennsylvania Reserves, in particular, suffered heavy losses including its division commander, who was captured by the Confederates, and two of its three brigadiers, John F. Reynolds, who was also captured, and George Meade, who was wounded. The III Corps fought at Glendale, however, the rest of the army was not heavily engaged in the week-long fight aside from Slocum's division of the VI Corps, which was sent to reinforce the V Corps at Gaines Mill.

The Army of the Potomac remained on the Virginia Peninsula until August, when it was recalled to Washington D.C. Keyes and one of the two IV Corps divisions were left behind permanently as part of the newly created Department of the James, while the other division, commanded by Brig. Gen Darius Couch, was attached to the VI Corps.

During the Second Battle of Bull Run, the III and V Corps were temporarily attached to Pope's army; the former suffered major losses and was sent back to Washington to rest and refit afterward, so it did not participate in the Maryland campaign. In the battle, Pope issued confusing orders to the V Corps, eventually directing them against Jackson's flank, ignoring Longstreet's troops on the Union flank. Pope blamed the defeat at Second Bull Run on Porter, who was court-martialed and spent much of his life seeking exoneration. Sigel's command, now redesignated the XI Corps, also spent the Maryland campaign in Washington resting and refitting.

In the Maryland campaign, the Army of the Potomac had six corps. These were the I Corps, commanded by Joe Hooker after Irvin McDowell was removed from command, the II Corps, commanded by Edwin Sumner, the V Corps, headed by Fitz-John Porter, the VI Corps, headed by William Franklin, the IX Corps, headed by Ambrose Burnside and formerly the Department of North Carolina, and the XII Corps, headed by Nathaniel Banks until September 12, and given to Joseph K. Mansfield just two days prior to Antietam, where he was killed in action.

At Antietam, the I and XII Corps were the first Union outfits to fight and both corps suffered enormous casualties (plus the loss of their commanders) so that they were down to near-division strength and their brigades at regimental strength after the battle was over. The II and IX Corps were also heavily engaged but the V and VI Corps largely stayed out of the battle.

When Burnside took over command of the army from McClellan in the fall, he formed the army into four Grand Divisions. The Right Grand Division was commanded by Edwin Sumner and comprised the II and XI Corps, the Center Grand Division, commanded by Joe Hooker, comprised the V and III Corps, and the Left Grand Division, commanded by William Franklin, comprised the VI and I Corps. In addition, the Reserve Grand Division, commanded by Franz Sigel, comprised the XI and XII Corps.

At Fredericksburg, the I Corps was commanded by John F. Reynolds, the II Corps by Darius Couch, the III Corps by George Stoneman, the V Corps by Daniel Butterfield, the VI Corps by William F. Smith, and the IX Corps by Orlando Willcox. The XI Corps was commanded by Franz Sigel and the XII Corps by Henry Slocum, however, neither corps was present at Fredericksburg, the former not arriving until after the battle was over, and the latter was stationed at Harper's Ferry.

Following Fredericksburg, Burnside was removed from command of the army and replaced by Joe Hooker. Hooker immediately abolished the Grand Divisions and also for the first time organized the cavalry into a proper corps led by George Stoneman instead of having them ineffectually scattered among infantry divisions. Burnside and his old IX Corps departed out to a command in the Western Theater. The I, II, and XII Corps retained the same commanders they had had during the Fredericksburg campaign, but the other corps got new commanders once again. Daniel Butterfield was chosen by Hooker as his new chief of staff and command of the V Corps went to George Meade. Daniel Sickles received command of the III Corps and Oliver Howard the XI Corps after Franz Sigel had resigned, refusing to serve under Hooker, his junior in rank. William Franklin also left the army for the same reason. Edwin Sumner, who was in his 60s and exhausted from campaigning, departed as well and died a few months later. William F. Smith resigned from command of the VI Corps, which was taken over by John Sedgwick. The I and V Corps were not significantly engaged during the Chancellorsville campaign.

Map depicting the march of Meade's men towards Gettysburg through Maryland

During the Gettysburg campaign, the army's existing organization was largely retained, but a number of brigades composed of short-term nine-month regiments departed as their enlistment terms expired. Darius Couch resigned from command of the II Corps after Chancellorsville, the corps going to Winfield Hancock. The Pennsylvania Reserves Division, having spent several months in Washington D.C. resting and refitting from the 1862 campaigns, returned to the army, but was added to the V Corps rather than rejoining the I Corps. George Stoneman had been removed from command of the cavalry corps by Hooker after a poor performance during the Chancellorsville campaign and replaced by Alfred Pleasanton.

George Meade was suddenly appointed the commander of the army on June 28, a mere three days before the battle of Gettysburg. At the battle, the I, II, and III Corps suffered such severe losses that they were almost nonfunctional as fighting units at the end. One corps commander (Reynolds) was killed, another (Sickles) lost a leg and was permanently out of the war, and a third (Hancock) was badly wounded and never completely recovered from his injuries. The VI Corps had not been significantly engaged and was mostly used to plug up holes in the line during the battle.

For the remainder of the war, corps were added and subtracted from the army. IV Corps was broken up after the Peninsula campaign, with its headquarters and 2nd Division left behind in Yorktown, while its 1st Division moved north, attached to the VI Corps, in the Maryland campaign. Those parts of the IV Corps that remained on the Peninsula were reassigned to the Department of Virginia and disbanded on October 1, 1863. Those added to the Army of the Potomac were IX Corps, XI Corps (Sigel's I Corps in the former Army of Virginia), XII Corps (Banks's II Corps from the Army of Virginia), added in 1862; and the Cavalry Corps, created in 1863.

Eight of these corps (seven infantry, one cavalry) served in the army during 1863, but due to attrition and transfers, the army was reorganized in March 1864 with only four corps: II, V, VI, and Cavalry. Of the original eight, I and III Corps were disbanded due to heavy casualties and their units combined into other corps. The XI and XII Corps were ordered to the West in late 1863 to support the Chattanooga campaign, and while there were combined into the XX Corps, never returning to the East.

The IX Corps returned to the army in 1864, after being assigned to the West in 1863 and then served alongside, but not as part of, the Army of the Potomac from March to May 24, 1864. On that latter date, IX Corps was formally added to the Army of the Potomac. Two divisions of the Cavalry Corps have transferred in August 1864 to Maj. Gen. Philip Sheridan's Army of the Shenandoah, and the 2nd Division alone remained under Meade's command.

On March 26, 1865, that division was also assigned to Sheridan for the closing campaigns of the war.

== Commanders ==
- Brigadier General Irvin McDowell: Commander of the Army and Department of Northeastern Virginia (May 27 – July 25, 1861)
- Major General George B. McClellan: Commander of the Military Division of the Potomac, and later, the Army and Department of the Potomac (July 26, 1861 – November 9, 1862)
- Major General Ambrose E. Burnside: Commander of the Army of the Potomac (November 9, 1862 – January 26, 1863)
- Major General Joseph Hooker: Commander of the Army and Department of the Potomac (January 26 – June 28, 1863)
- Major General George G. Meade: Commander of the Army of the Potomac† (June 28, 1863 – June 28, 1865)††

Notes
†Lt. Gen. Ulysses S. Grant, general-in-chief of all Union armies, located his headquarters with the Army of the Potomac and provided operational direction to Meade from May 1864 to April 1865, but Meade retained command of the Army of the Potomac.

††Major General John G. Parke took brief temporary command during Meade's absences on four occasions during this period)

== Major battles and campaigns ==
- First Bull Run Campaign or First Manassas: McDowell (as "Army of Northeastern Virginia")
- Peninsula campaign, including the Seven Days Battles: McClellan
- Northern Virginia campaign, including the Second Battle of Bull Run (I, XI, XII Corps participated under the control of the Army of Virginia)
- Maryland campaign, including the Battle of Antietam: McClellan
- Fredericksburg Campaign: Burnside
- Chancellorsville Campaign: Hooker
- Gettysburg campaign: Hooker/Meade (Meade appointed June 28, 1863)
- Bristoe campaign: Meade
- Mine Run campaign: Meade
- Overland Campaign: Grant & Meade
- Richmond–Petersburg Campaign, including the Battle of the Crater: Grant & Meade
- Appomattox campaign, including Lee's surrender at Appomattox Court House: Grant & Meade

== Casualties breakdown ==
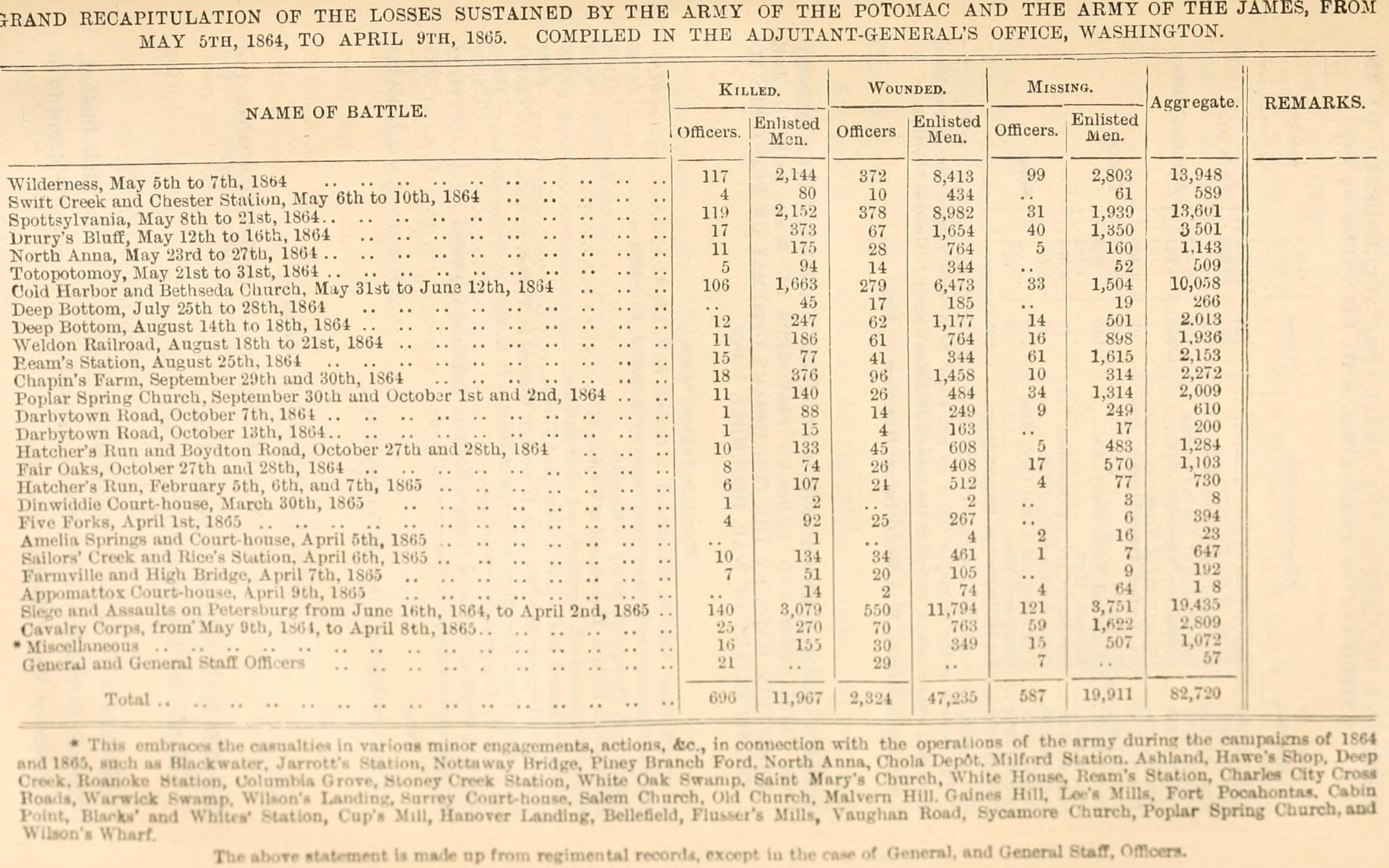
Losses sustained by the Army of the Potomac and the Army of the James between May 5, 1864, and April 9, 1865, compiled in the Adjutant-General's Office in Washington, D.C.
