= 102nd New York Infantry Regiment =

- Active: November 1, 1861 - July 21, 1865
- Country: United States
- Allegiance: Union
- Branch: Infantry
- Engagements: Battle of Cedar Mountain; Battle of Antietam; Battle of Chancellorsville; Battle of Gettysburg; Chattanooga campaign Battle of Lookout Mountain; Battle of Missionary Ridge; Battle of Ringgold Gap; Atlanta campaign Battle of Resaca; Battle of Dallas; Battle of New Hope Church; Battle of Gilgal Church; Battle of Kennesaw Mountain; Battle of Peachtree Creek; Siege of Atlanta; Sherman's March to the Sea; Carolinas campaign Battle of Bentonville

The 102nd New York Infantry Regiment ("Van Buren Light Infantry") was an infantry regiment in the Union Army during the American Civil War. The regiment played a prominent part in numerous key battles in both the Eastern and Western theaters of the war. It was noted for its holding the high ground at the center of the line at Antietam as part of Stainrook's 2nd Brigade, Greene's 2nd Division of Mansfield's XII Corps. It was further highly regarded for its actions at the Battle of Gettysburg, the Battle of Lookout Mountain, and the Atlanta campaign.

== Service ==
The 102nd New York Infantry was organized at New York City beginning November 1, 1861 and mustered in for a three-year enlistment March 5, 1862 under the command of Colonel Thomas B. Van Buren.

The regiment was attached to:

- Wadsworth's Command, Military District of Washington, to May 1862.
- Cooper's 1st Brigade, Sigel's Division, Department of the Shenandoah, to June 1862.
- 1st Brigade, 2nd Division, II Corps, Pope's Army of Virginia, to August 1862.
- 2nd Brigade, 2nd Division, II Corps, Army of Virginia, to September 1862.
- 2nd Brigade, 2nd Division, XII Corps, Army of the Potomac, to October 1862.
- 3rd Brigade, 2nd Division, XII Corps, Army of the Potomac, to October 1863,
  - and Army of the Cumberland to April 1864.
- 3rd Brigade, 2nd Division, XX Corps, Army of the Cumberland, to June 1865.
- 1st Brigade, Bartlett's Division, XXII Corps, Department of Washington, to July 1865.

The 102nd New York Infantry mustered out of service on July 21, 1865.

== Detailed service ==
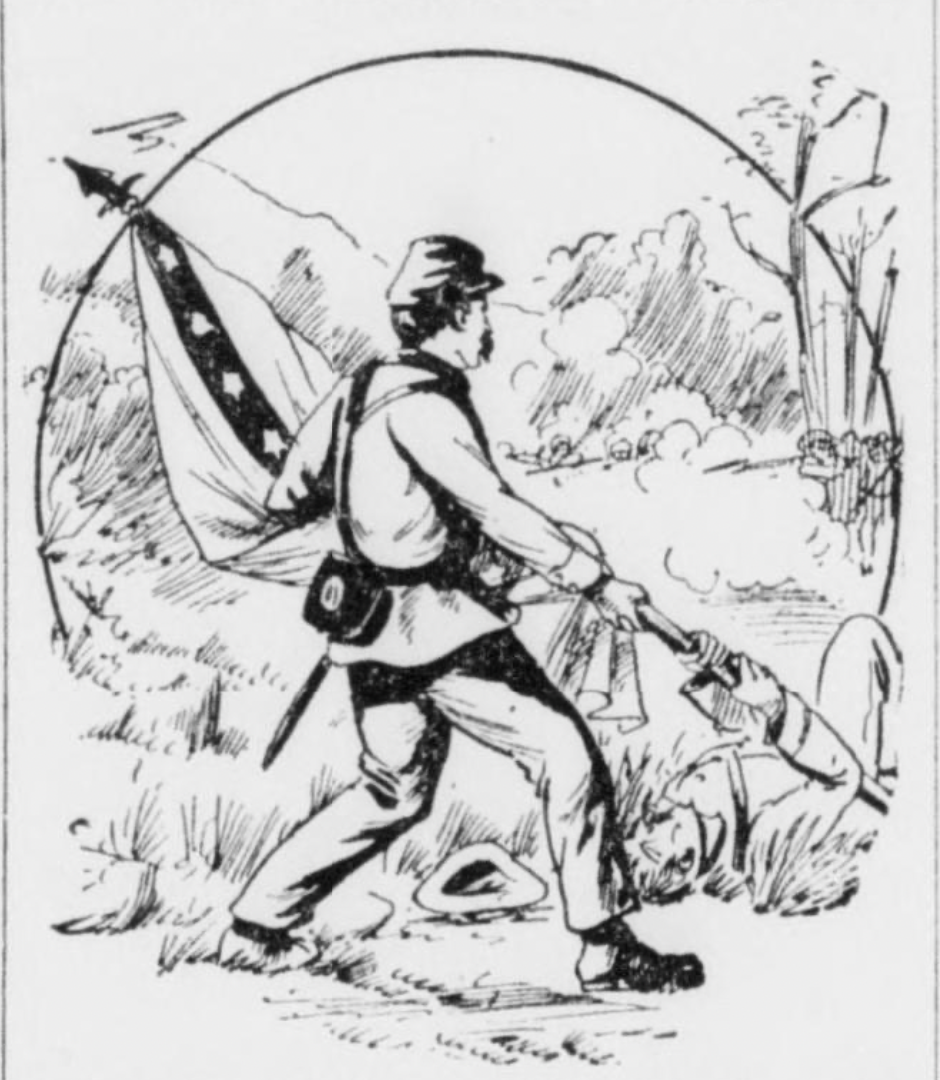
Battle flag of the 12th Georgia being captured by the Captain Green

Left New York for Washington, D. C, March 10, 1862. Duty in the defenses of Washington, D.C., until May 1862. Moved to Harpers Ferry, Va., May. Defense of Harpers Ferry against Jackson's attack May 28–30. Operations in the Shenandoah Valley until August. Battle of Cedar Mountain August 9. Pope's Campaign in northern Virginia August 16-September 2. Guard trains during the campaign. Maryland Campaign September 6–22. Battle of Antietam September 16–17. Duty at Bolivar Heights until December. Reconnaissance to Rippon, Va., November 9. Expedition to Winchester December 2–6. March to Fredericksburg, Va., December 9–16. At Fairfax Station until January 20, 1863. "Mud March" January 20–24. Regiment detached in New York on special duty March 10-April 4. Chancellorsville Campaign April 27-May 6. Battle of Chancellorsville May 1–5. Gettysburg Campaign June 11-July 24. Battle of Gettysburg July 1–3. Pursuit of Lee to Manassas Gap, Va., July 5–24. Duty on line of the Rappahannock until September. Movement to Bridgeport, Ala., September 24-October 3. Reopening Tennessee River October 26–29. Guarding railroad until November. Chattanooga-Ringgold Campaign November 23–27. Battle of Lookout Mountain November 23–24. Battle of Missionary Ridge November 25. Battle of Ringgold Gap, Taylor's Ridge, November 27. Duty in Lookout Valley until May 1864. Atlanta Campaign May 1-September 8. Demonstrations on Rocky Faced Ridge May 8–11. Battle of Resaca May 14–15. Near Cassville May 19. Advance on Dallas May 22–25. New Hope Church May 25. Battles about Dallas, New Hope Church, and Allatoona Hills May 26-June 5. Operations about Marietta and against Kennesaw Mountain June 10-July 2. Pine Hill June 11–14. Lost Mountain June 15–17. Gilgal or Golgotha Church June 15. Muddy Creek June 17. Noyes Creek June 19. Kolb's Farm June 22. Assault on Kennesaw June 27. Ruff's Station, Smyrna Camp Ground, July 4. Chattahoochie River July 5–17. Peachtree Creek July 19–20. Siege of Atlanta July 22-August 25. Operations at Chattahoochie River Bridge August 26-September 2. Occupation of Atlanta September 2-November 15. Expedition from Atlanta to Tuckum's Cross Roads October 26–29. Near Atlanta November 9. March to the sea November 15-December 10. Near Davidsboro November 28. Siege of Savannah December 10–21. Carolinas Campaign January to April 1865. Battle of Bentonville, N.C., March 19–21. Occupation of Goldsboro March 24. Advance on Raleigh April 9–13. Occupation of Raleigh April 14. Bennett's House April 26. Surrender of Johnston and his army. March to Washington, D.C., via Richmond, Va., April 29-May 20. Grand Review of the Armies May 24. Duty at Washington, D.C., until July.

== Casualties ==
The regiment lost a total of 155 men during service; 7 officers and 66 enlisted men killed or mortally wounded, 82 enlisted men died of disease.

== Commanders ==
- Colonel Thomas B. Van Buren
- Colonel James C. Lane
- Colonel Herbert Hammerstien
- Colonel Harvey S. Chatfield
- Major Oscar J. Spaulding - commanded during the Carolinas Campaign
- Captain Lewis R. Stegman - commanded at the Battle of Gettysburg after Col. Lane was wounded in action on July 2

== In popular media ==
- The regiment is mentioned by William Riker in the Star Trek: Voyager episode "Death Wish". Thaddeus "Old Iron Boots" Riker was named as fictional commander of the regiment.

== See also ==
- List of New York Civil War regiments
- New York in the Civil War
