= 111th Pennsylvania Infantry Regiment =

Union Army infantry regiment

111th Pennsylvania Volunteer Infantry
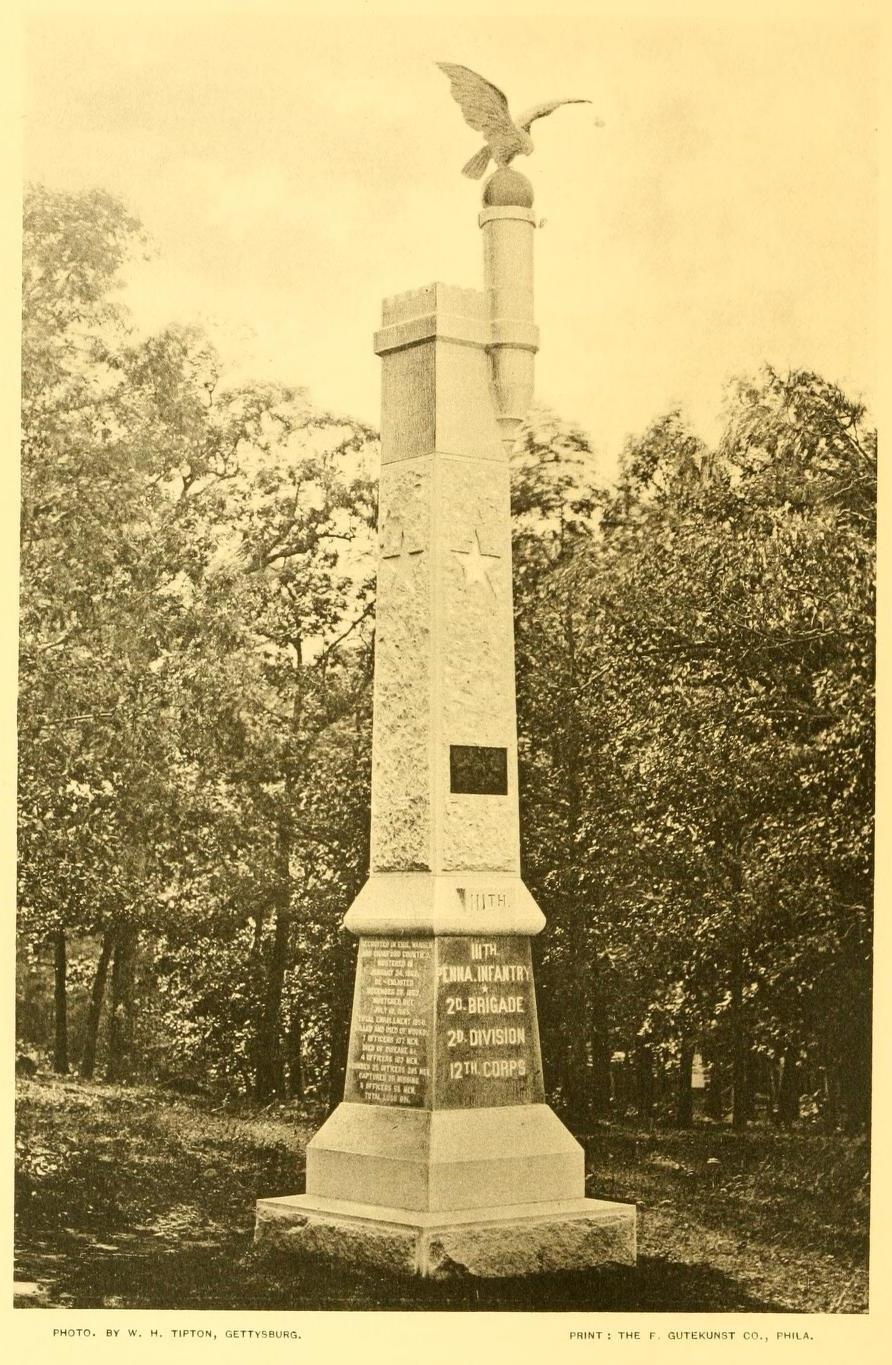
- Monument of the 111th Pennsylvania
- Active: December 1861 – July 19, 1865
- Country: United States
- Allegiance: Union
- Branch: Infantry
- Size: 1,852
- Engagements: Battle of Cedar Mountain; Battle of Antietam; Battle of Chancellorsville; Battle of Gettysburg; Chattanooga campaign Battle of Wauhatchie; Battle of Lookout Mountain; Battle of Missionary Ridge; Battle of Ringgold Gap; Atlanta campaign Battle of Resaca; Battle of Dallas; Battle of New Hope Church; Battle of Allatoona; Battle of Gilgal Church; Battle of Kennesaw Mountain; Battle of Peachtree Creek; Siege of Atlanta; Sherman's March to the Sea; Carolinas campaign Battle of Bentonville

The 111th Pennsylvania Volunteer Infantry was an infantry regiment that served in the Union Army during the American Civil War. It was noted for its holding the high ground at the center of the line at Antietam as part of Stainrook's 2nd Brigade, Greene's 2nd Division of Mansfield's XII Corps.

== Service ==
The 111th Pennsylvania Infantry was organized at Erie, Pennsylvania beginning in December 1861 and mustered in for a three-year enlistment under the command of Colonel Matthew Schlaudecker.

The regiment was attached to Cooper's 1st Brigade, Sigel's Division, Department of the Shenandoah, to June 1862. 1st Brigade, 1st Division, II Corps, Army of Virginia, to August 1862. 2nd Brigade, 2nd Division, II Corps, Army of Virginia, to September 1862. 2nd Brigade, 2nd Division, XII Corps, Army of the Potomac, to October 1862. 3rd Brigade, 2nd Division, XII Corps, to January 1863. 2nd Brigade, 2nd Division, XII Corps, Army of the Potomac, to October 1863, and Army of the Cumberland to April 1864. 3rd Brigade, 2nd Division, XX Corps, Army of the Cumberland, to July 1865.

The 111th Pennsylvania Infantry mustered out July 19, 1865.

== Detailed service ==
The 111th was recruited in the counties of Erie, Warren and Crawford and its organization was completed at Erie on Jan. 24, 1862, when it was mustered in for three years' service. It moved to Harrisburg and thence to Baltimore where it remained until May, when it was sent to Harper's Ferry to join Gen. Banks. It remained in that vicinity until July, and then proceeded to Cedar Mountain, where it fought as part of the 2nd Brigade, 2nd Division, 2nd Corps. At Antietam it lost over one-third of the number engaged but was highly praised for its daring by Gen. Greene, who commanded the division, and it was presented with a stand of colors by Col. Stainrook commanding the brigade. Two months were spent in camp on Loudoun Heights, near Harper's Ferry, and with the 12th Corps, to which it had been transferred, the 111th arrived at Fredericksburg too late for the battle. Winter quarters were established at Fairfax Station, the regiment leaving camp for the "Mud March" in Jan., 1863, after which it was sent to Acquia Creek and assigned to the 2nd Brigade, 2nd Division, 12th Corps. On March 3, it was selected by Gen. Hooker as one of ten regiments to receive special commendation, practically shown by increase of absences and furloughs allowed. It joined in the Chancellorsville Campaign, but returned to Acquia Creek Landing until June 13, when it was ordered to Leesburg. It was active at Gettysburg, where it was more fortunate than many of the Pennsylvania regiments. It remained with the army until Sept. 15, when it was ordered west with the 12th Corps and reached Murfreesboro, Tenn., on Oct. 6. It took part in the Battle of Wauhatchie; went into camp on Raccoon Mountain; and fought in the battles of Lookout Mountain and Missionary Ridge in November. In December, practically the whole regiment reenlisted and in the spring of 1864, returned to Bridgeport, Ala., strengthened by the addition of new recruits. It was assigned to the 3rd Brigade, 2nd Division, 20th Corps, and took part in the Atlanta Campaign, being engaged at Resaca, New Hope Church, Dallas, Peachtree Creek and Atlanta. On Sept. 2, with five other regiments it was sent forward to reconnoiter and entered the city. It camped in Atlanta until about the middle of November, when it rejoined the division at Milledgeville. In March, 1865, the 109th Pa. was consolidated with it and it moved on to Washington, where it participated in the grand review and on July 19, 1865, was mustered out of the service of the Union it had served so well. The total strength of the regiment is recorded as 1,847, but 100 drafted men deserted on the journey to Tennessee; 310 recruits belonged to the 109th Pa.; 42 members failed to report, making the actual strength 1,395.

== Casualties ==
The regiment lost a total of 304 men during service; 7 officers and 138 enlisted men killed or mortally wounded, 4 officers and 155 enlisted men died of disease.

== Commanders ==
- Colonel Matthew Schlaudecker – resigned November 6, 1862
- Colonel George A. Cobham Jr. – killed in action at the Battle of Peachtree Creek; posthumously promoted to brevet brigadier general
- Colonel Thomas McCormick Walker – promoted to brevet brigadier general July 5, 1865

== See also ==
- List of Pennsylvania Civil War Units
- Pennsylvania in the Civil War
