= 66th Ohio Infantry Regiment =

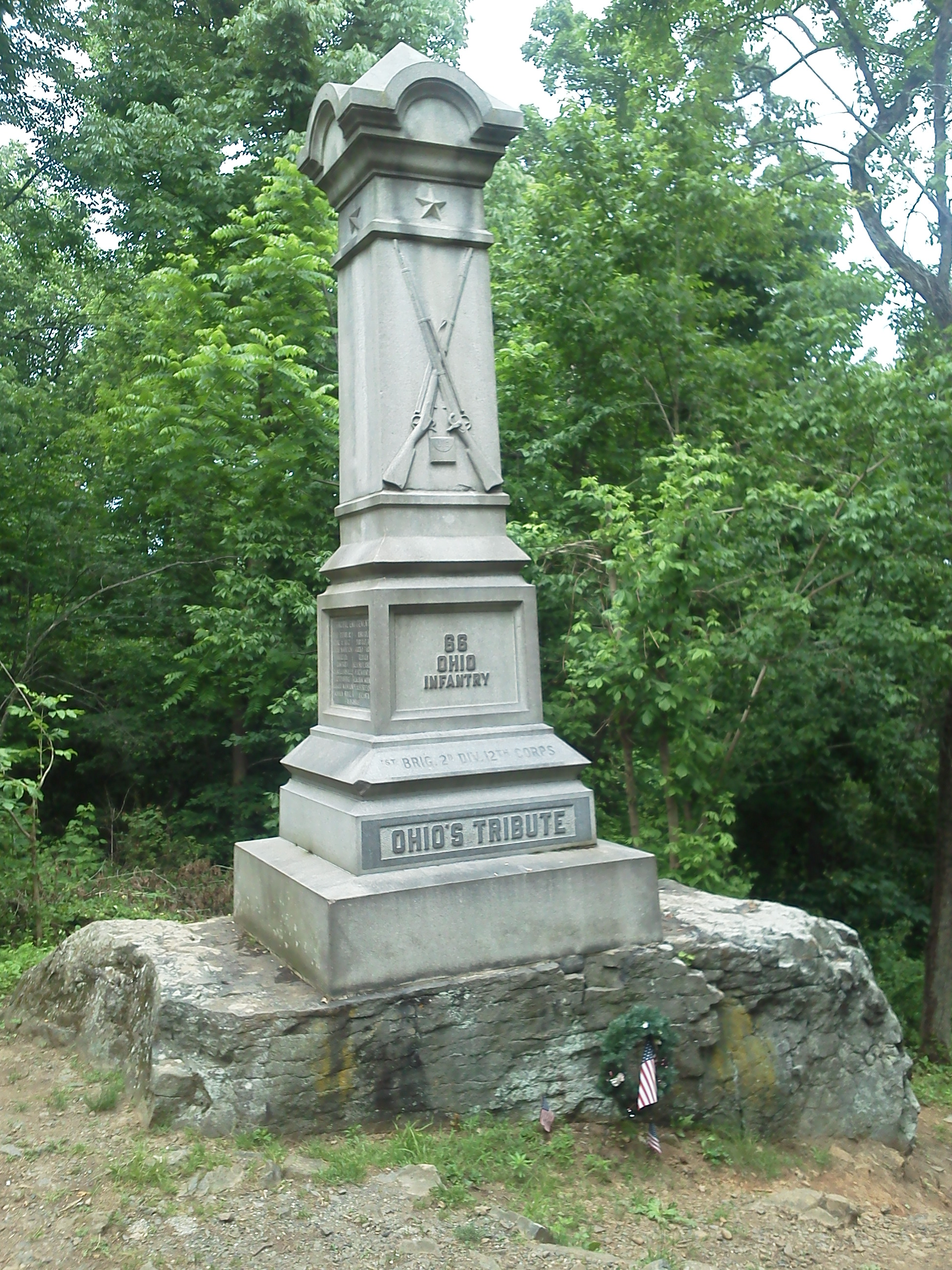
- Active: December 17, 1861, to July 15, 1865
- Country: United States
- Allegiance: Union
- Branch: Infantry
- Engagements: Battle of Port Republic; Maryland Campaign; Battle of Cedar Mountain; Battle of Antietam; Battle of Chancellorsville; Gettysburg campaign; Battle of Gettysburg; New York Draft Riots; Chattanooga campaign; Battle of Lookout Mountain; Battle of Missionary Ridge; Atlanta campaign; Battle of Resaca; Battle of Dallas; Battle of New Hope Church; Battle of Allatoona; Battle of Kennesaw Mountain; Battle of Peachtree Creek; Siege of Atlanta; Sherman's March to the Sea; Carolinas campaign; Battle of Bentonville

The 66th Ohio Infantry Regiment was an infantry regiment in the Union Army during the American Civil War. It was noted for its holding the high ground at the center of the line at Antietam as part of Tyndale's 1st Brigade, Greene's 2nd Division of Mansfield's XII Corps.

== Service ==
The 66th Ohio Infantry Regiment was organized at Camp McArthur in Urbana, Ohio and mustered in for three years service on December 17, 1861, under the command of Colonel Charles Candy.

The regiment was attached to 3rd Brigade, Landers' Division, Army of the Potomac, to March 1862. 2nd Brigade, Shields' 2nd Division, Banks' V Corps and Department of the Shenandoah, to May 1862. 2nd Brigade, Shields' Division, Department of the Rappahannock, to June 1862. 2nd Brigade, 1st Division, II Corps, Army of Virginia, to August 1862. 1st Brigade, 2nd Division, II Corps, Army of Virginia, to September 1862. 1st Brigade, 2nd Division, XII Corps, Army of the Potomac, to October 1863, and Army of the Cumberland to April 1864. 1st Brigade, 2nd Division, XX Corps, Army of the Cumberland, to July 1865.

The 66th Ohio Infantry mustered out of service at Louisville, Kentucky, on July 15, 1865.

== Detailed service ==
=== 1862 ===
Ordered to New Creek, Va., January 17, 1862. Advance toward Winchester, Va., March 7–15, 1862. Provost duty at Martinsburg, Winchester, and Strasburg until May. March to Fredericksburg, Va., May 12–21, and to Port Republic May 25-June 7. Battle of Port Republic June 9. Ordered to Alexandria and duty there until August. Operations near Cedar Mountain August 10–18. Pope's Campaign in northern Virginia August 18-September 2. Guarding trains of the army during the battles of Bull Run August 28–30. Maryland Campaign September 6–22. Battle of Antietam September 16–17. Duty at Bolivar Heights until December. Reconnaissance to Rippon, Va., November 9. Reconnaissance to Winchester December 2–6. Berryville December 1. Dumfries December 27.

=== 1863 ===
"Mud March" January 20–24, 1863. At Stafford Court House until April 27. Chancellorsville Campaign April 27-May 6. Battle of Chancellorsville May 1–5. Gettysburg Campaign June 11-July 24. Battle of Gettysburg (where they have a monument and markers designating their position on Culp's Hill) July 1–3. Pursuit of Lee to Manassas Gap, Va., July 5–24. Duty at New York during draft disturbances August 15-September 8. Movement to Bridgeport, Ala., September 24-October 3. Skirmish at Garrison's Creek near Fosterville October 6 (detachment). Reopening Tennessee River October 26–29. Chattanooga-Ringgold Campaign November 23–27. Lookout Mountain November 23–24. Missionary Ridge November 25. Ringgold Gap, Taylor's Ridge, November 27. Regiment reenlisted December 15, 1863.

=== 1864 ===
Duty at Bridgeport and in Alabama until May 1864. Scout to Caperton's Ferry March 29-April 2. Expedition from Bridgeport down Tennessee River to Triana April 12–16. Atlanta Campaign May 1-September 8. Demonstrations on Rocky Faced Ridge May 8–11. Dug Gap or Mill Creek May 8. Battle of Resaca May 14–15. Cassville May 19. New Hope Church May 25. Operations on line of Pumpkin Vine Creek and battles about Dallas, New Hope Church, and Allatoona Hills May 25-June 5. Operations about Marietta and against Kennesaw Mountain June 10-July 2. Pine Hill June 11–14. Lost Mountain June 15–17. Gilgal or Golgotha Church June 15. Muddy Creek June 17. Noyes Creek June 19. Kolb's Farm June 22. Assault on Kennesaw June 27. Ruff's Station July 4. Chattahoochie River July 5–17. Peachtree Creek July 19–20. Siege of Atlanta July 22-August 25. Operations at Chattahoochie River Bridge August 26-September 2. Occupation of Atlanta September 2-November 15. Near Atlanta November 9. March to the sea November 15-December 10. Siege of Savannah December 10–21.

=== 1865 ===
Campaign of the Carolinas January to April 1865. Little Cohora Creek, N.C., March 16. Battle of Bentonville March 19–21. Occupation of Goldsboro March 24. Advance on Raleigh April 10–14. Occupation of Raleigh April 14. Bennett's House April 26. Surrender of Johnston and his army. March to Washington, D.C., via Richmond, Va., April 29-May 20. Grand Review of the Armies May 24. Moved to Louisville, Ky., June.

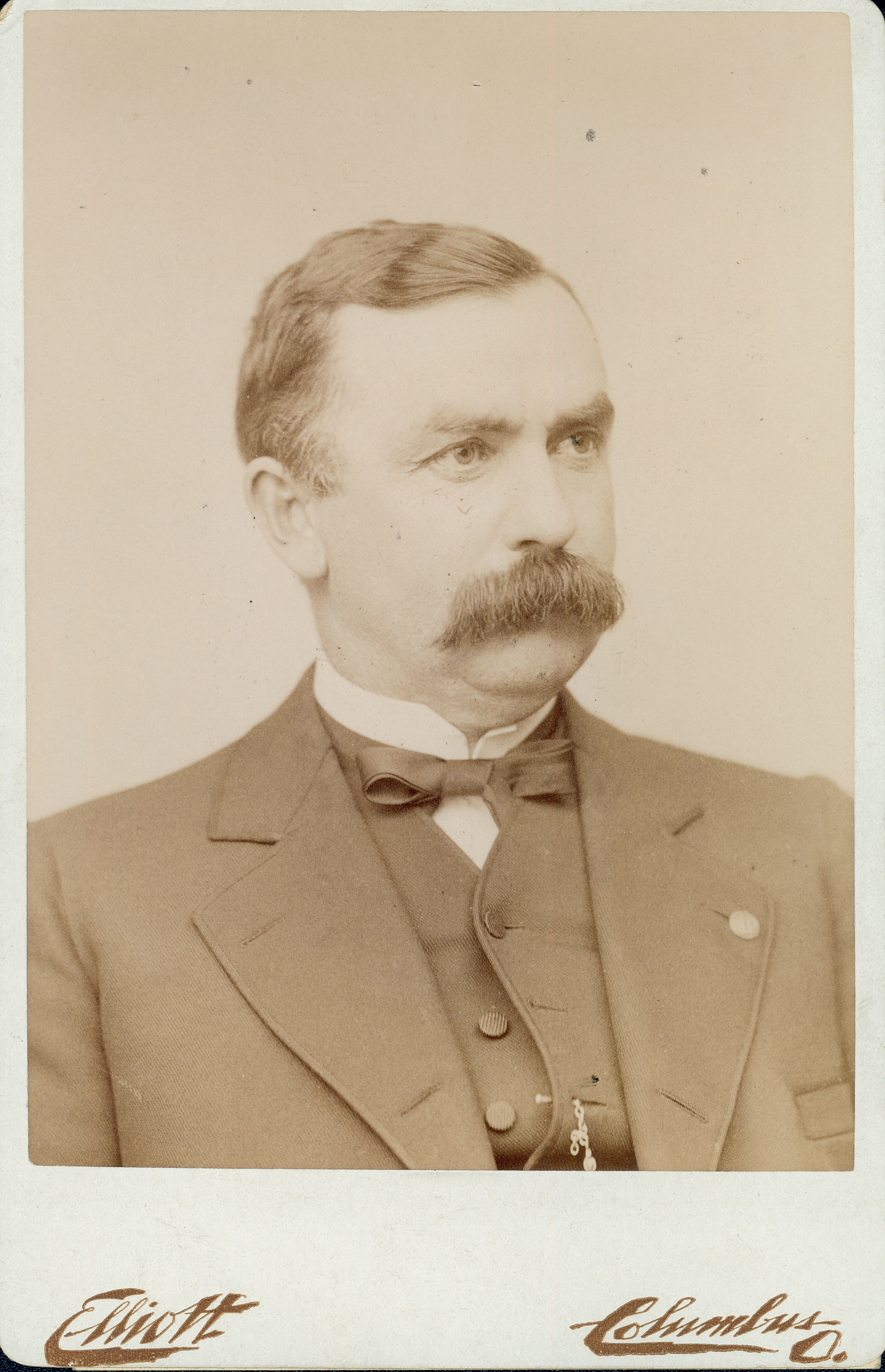
Captain John T. Morgan Co I 66th OVI

== Casualties ==
The regiment lost a total of 245 men during service; 5 officers and 96 enlisted men killed or mortally wounded, 1 officer and 143 enlisted men died of disease.

== Commanders ==
- Colonel Charles Candy
- Lieutenant Colonel Eugene Powell - commanded at the battles of Antietam (where he was wounded), Chancellorsville, Gettysburg, et al.

== Notable members ==
- Private William Wallace Cranston, Company A - Medal of Honor recipient for action at the battle of Chancellorsville; later promoted to captain
- Sergeant Henry Heller, Company A - Medal of Honor recipient for action at the battle of Chancellorsville
- Private Elisha B. Seaman, Company A - Medal of Honor recipient for action at the battle of Chancellorsville
- Sergeant Thomas Thompson, Company A - Medal of Honor recipient for action at the battle of Chancellorsville

== See also ==
- List of Ohio Civil War units
- Ohio in the Civil War
