= 109th Pennsylvania Infantry Regiment =

Union Army infantry regiment

109th Pennsylvania Volunteer Infantry
- Active: December 1861 - March 31, 1865
- Country: United States
- Allegiance: Union
- Branch: Infantry
- Engagements: Battle of Cedar Mountain; Battle of Chancellorsville; Battle of Gettysburg; Battle of Wauhatchie; Battle of Lookout Mountain; Battle of Missionary Ridge; Atlanta campaign Battle of Resaca; Battle of Kennesaw Mountain; Battle of Peachtree Creek; Siege of Atlanta; Sherman's March to the Sea; Carolinas campaign Battle of Bentonville

The 109th Pennsylvania Volunteer Infantry (aka "Curtin Light Guards") was an infantry regiment that served in the Union Army during the American Civil War.

== Service ==
The 109th Pennsylvania Infantry was organized at Philadelphia, Pennsylvania beginning December 1861 and mustered in for three-years service under the command of Colonel Henry J. Stainrook.

The regiment was attached to 1st Brigade, Sigel's Division, Department of the Shenandoah, to June 1862. 1st Brigade, 2nd Division, II Corps, Army of Virginia, to August 1862. 2nd Brigade, 2nd Division, II Corps, Army of Virginia, to September 1862. 2nd Brigade, 2nd Division, XII Corps, Army of the Potomac, to October 1862. 3rd Brigade, 2nd Division, XII Corps, to January 1863. 2nd Brigade, 2nd Division, XII Corps, Army of the Potomac, to October 1863, and Army of the Cumberland to April 1864. 2nd Brigade, 2nd Division, XX Corps, Army of the Cumberland, to March 1865.

The 109th Pennsylvania Infantry ceased to exist on March 31, 1865, when it was consolidated with the 111th Pennsylvania Infantry.

== Detailed service ==
Moved to Washington, D.C., May 10; then to Harpers Ferry May 24, 1862. Defense of Harpers Ferry, Va., May 24–30, 1862. Operations in the Shenandoah Valley until August. Battle of Cedar Mountain August 9. Pope's campaign in northern Virginia August 16-September 2. Guarded supply trains during the Second Battle of Bull Run. Maryland Campaign September 6–22. Battle of Antietam September 16–17 (reserve). Duty at Bolivar Heights until December. Reconnaissance to Ripon, Va., November 9. Reconnaissance to Winchester December 2–6. Marched to Fredericksburg December 9–16. Burnside's 2nd Campaign, "Mud March," January 20–24, 1863. At Stafford Court House until April 27. Chancellorsville Campaign April 27-May 6. Battle of Chancellorsville May 1–5. Gettysburg Campaign June 11-July 24. Battle of Gettysburg July 1–3. Pursuit of Lee July 5–24. Duty near Raccoon Ford until September. Movement to Bridgeport, Ala., September 24-October 3. Reopening Tennessee River October 26–29. Battle of Wauhatchie October 28–29. Chattanooga-Ringgold Campaign November 23–27. Lookout Mountain November 23–24. Missionary Ridge November 25. Ringgold Gap, Taylor's Ridge, Ga., November 27. Duty on Nashville & Chattanooga Railroad until April 1864. Atlanta Campaign May 1-September 8. Demonstration on Rocky Faced Ridge May 8–11. Battle of Resaca May 14–15. Near Cassville May 19. New Hope Church May 25. Operations on line of Pumpkin Vine Creek and bathes about Dallas, New Hope Church, and Allatoona Hills May 25-June 5. Operations about Marietta and against Kennesaw Mountain June 10-July 2. Pine Hill June 11–14. Lost Mountain June 15–17. Gilgal or Golgotha Church June 15. Muddy Creek June 17. Noyes Creek June 19. Kolb's Farm June 22. Assault on Kennesaw June 27. Ruff's Station or Smyrna Camp Ground July 4. Chattahoochie River July 5–17. Peachtree Creek July 19–20. Siege of Atlanta July 22-August 25. Operations at Chattahoochie River Bridge August 26-September 2. Occupation of Atlanta September 2-November 15. Expedition to Tuckum's Cross Roads October 26–29. Near Atlanta November 9. March to the sea November 15-December 10. Siege of Savannah December 10–21. Carolinas Campaign January to March 1865. Battle of Bentonville, N.C., March 19–21.

== Casualties ==
The regiment lost a total of 135 men during service; 3 officers and 61 enlisted men killed or mortally wounded, 71 enlisted men died of disease.

== Commanders ==
- Colonel Henry J. Stainrook - killed in action at the Battle of Chancellorsville
- Colonel Charles M. Harris - discharged October 25, 1862
- Lieutenant Colonel Lewis W. Ralston - commissioned colonel, but never mustered at rank
- Captain Frederick L. Gimber - commanded at the Battle of Gettysburg

== See also ==
- List of Pennsylvania Civil War Units
- Pennsylvania in the Civil War
