= Henry Heller =

Henry Heller may refer to:

- Henry Heller (Medal of Honor) (c. 1841–1895), Union Army sergeant and Medal of Honor recipient
- Henry B. Heller (1941–2021), American politician from Maryland
- Henry D. Heller (1850–1928), American politician from Pennsylvania
