= Charles Candy =

Union army soldier

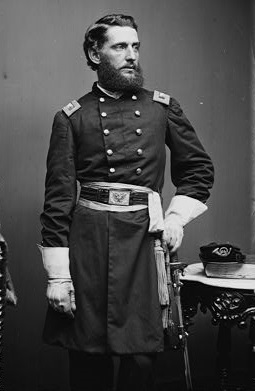
- Born: August 7, 1832; Lexington, Kentucky
- Died: October 28, 1910 (aged 78); Dayton, Ohio
- Burial place: Arlington National Cemetery
- Military career
- Allegiance: United States of America; Union
- Branch: United States Army; Union Army
- Service years: 1850–1861; 1861–1865
- Rank: Colonel; Brevet Brigadier General
- Commands: Candy's Brigade, XII Corps
- Conflicts: American Civil War; Battle of Ball's Bluff; Battle of Cedar Mountain; Mud March; Battle of Chancellorsville; Battle of Gettysburg; Battle of Wauhatchie; Battle of Lookout Mountain; Atlanta campaign

Charles Candy (August 7, 1832 – October 28, 1910) was a career soldier in the United States Army who served as an officer in the volunteer Union Army during the American Civil War. He commanded an Ohio regiment and, frequently, a brigade, during the war, and played a role in the defense of Culp's Hill during the July 1863 Battle of Gettysburg.

== Early life and career ==
Candy was born in Lexington, Kentucky. He joined the United States Army on May 14, 1850, as an enlisted man with the rank of private and subsequently served in a wide variety of garrisons and outposts. He served under Richard S. Ewell in the 1st Dragoons. He was promoted to corporal in March 1853. Candy was honorably discharged in May 1855.

Candy resumed his military career in January 1856 as a private in the 1st U.S. Infantry. In May 1856, he was promoted to sergeant. By the eve of the Civil War, he was a sergeant major. Discharged from the regular army on January 1, 1861, Candy became a volunteer clerk in the Department of the Ohio.

== Civil War service ==
Following the outbreak of the Civil War and the firing on the Union garrison at Fort Sumter in Charleston Harbor, Candy was appointed on September 21, 1861, as a captain and assistant adjutant general of volunteers. He served on the staff of Charles Pomeroy Stone at the time of the Battle of Ball's Bluff. Candy resigned his staff position on December 3, 1861. He was commissioned colonel of the 66th Ohio Infantry on December 17 of that year.

Candy led his regiment under Nathaniel Banks in what became II Corps of John Pope's Army of Virginia, serving in John W. Geary's brigade of Christopher C. Augur's division. When Geary was wounded in the Battle of Cedar Mountain, Candy succeeded to brigade command. Banks's corps missed the Second Battle of Bull Run, and Candy was absent when the corps—newly dubbed XII Corps, Army of the Potomac—fought in the Battle of Antietam. XII Corps was in reserve during the Battle of Fredericksburg. Candy would be in charge of the defense of Dumfries, Virginia during the December 27–29, 1862 Christmas Raids of Union supply depots by J.E.B. Stuart in Virginia. It would participate in Maj. Gen. Ambrose Burnside's Mud March.

Candy next saw action leading the First Brigade of Geary's Second Division, XII Corps, at the Battle of Chancellorsville. He commanded the same brigade at the Battle of Gettysburg, arriving on the Baltimore Pike, behind the Union right, late on the first day of the fight (July 1, 1863). Late in the day, Geary led the brigades of George S. Greene and Candy to Little Round Top to protect the Union left flank. The brigade returned to the right early the next day and took part in the defense of Culp's Hill. Candy's brigade was in reserve, except when Geary—trying to go to the relief of the left flank of the army—got lost and took it and the brigade of George A. Cobham, Jr., down the Baltimore Pike in the wrong direction.

When XII Corps was transferred west under the command of Major General Joseph Hooker later in 1863 to relieve the Army of the Cumberland besieged at Chattanooga, Candy was transferred with his brigade. It fought at the Battle of Wauhatchie. Candy was injured early in the Battle of Lookout Mountain, and he also missed the Battle of Ringgold Gap. When XII Corps and XI Corps were combined into Hooker's XX Corps of the Army of the Cumberland, Candy became commander of a brigade in Geary's second division. He led it in Major General William T. Sherman's Atlanta campaign until August 4, 1864. Candy was mustered out of the volunteer service on January 14, 1865, and he received a brevet appointment as a brigadier general on March 13, 1865.

== Postbellum career ==
After the war, Candy served as chief clerk in the Quartermaster General's office of the War Department. From 1888 to 1906, he was commissary of subsistence for the Southern Branch of the National Home for Disabled Soldiers.

Candy died in Dayton, Ohio. He is buried at Arlington National Cemetery.

== See also ==
- List of American Civil War brevet generals (Union)
