= Henry J. Stainrook =

- Born: c. 1826; Pennsylvania
- Died: May 3, 1863; Spotsylvania County, Virginia
- Burial place: Lawnview Cemetery, Rockledge, Pennsylvania
- Military career
- Allegiance: United States of America; Union
- Branch: United States Army; Union Army
- Service years: 1861-1863
- Rank: Colonel
- Commands: 109th Pennsylvania Infantry; 2nd Brigade, 2nd Division, XII Corps
- Conflicts: Battle of Cedar Mountain; Battle of Antietam; Battle of Fredericksburg; Battle of Chancellorsville †

Henry J. Stainrook (c. 1826-1863), occasionally spelled Steinrock, led a regiment of the Army of Virginia and the Army of the Potomac in the American Civil War. He briefly led a brigade at the Battle of Antietam. Stainrook was killed in the Battle of Chancellorsville.

== Before Antietam ==
Stainrook was a resident of Chester County, Pennsylvania at the outbreak of the war. Following President Abraham Lincoln's call for 75,000 volunteers to put down the rebellion, Stainrook enlisted on April 23, 1861 in the Union Army as the captain of Company C of the 22nd Pennsylvania Infantry, a three-month regiment. He was honorably mustered out following the expiration of his term of enlistment.

Subsequently, Stainrook was involved in organizing the 109th Pennsylvania Infantry and was commissioned its colonel with a nominal date of November 1, 1861. The regiment encamped in Philadelphia, Pennsylvania, near the State House before going to Virginia. His unit eventually became a part of the Army of Virginia under Maj. Gen. John Pope. Stainrook was wounded in the abdomen by a shell fragment at the Battle of Cedar Mountain during the Northern Virginia Campaign.

The 109th Pennsylvania served in the brigade of Brig. Gen. Henry Prince in the 2nd Division, II Corps at the Battle of Cedar Mountain on August 9, 1862. Brig. Gen. Christopher C. Augur led the division, and Maj. Gen. Nathaniel Banks led the corps. In their first battle, the 109th advanced under Confederate fire. Stainrook was wounded by Confederate artillery, but he refused to leave the field. The corps missed the Second Battle of Bull Run because it was guarding the army's rear areas. The 109th helped cover the army's retreat, destroying supplies that could not be moved.

== Antietam ==
After the removal of John Pope, his army was dissolved; and its units joined the Army of the Potomac. The old II Corps became XII Corps. Maj. Gen.Joseph K. Mansfield now led the corps, and Brig. Gen. George S. Greene led the 2nd division at the Battle of Antietam. After the I Corps had been exhausted in combat, the XII Corps went into the fray. One brigade (Goodrich) was detached from Greene's Division to join the Iron Brigade in the vicinity of the Miller Cornfield. The other brigades, under Lt. Col. Hector Tyndale and Stainrook, were committed to an attack on the high ground around the Dunker Church (Stainrook was without his own regiment, which was on detached duty.)

Stainrook's brigade, after some confusion in deploying, passed through the East Woods, driving away the remains of the division of Brig. Gen. John Bell Hood. Then it advanced with the Mumma farm buildings, already set afire by retreating Confederates on its left. The brigade moved along the axis of the Smoketown Road and reached the high ground at the Dunker Church. Greene's advance stopped there. Once Maj. Gen. John Sedgwick's division of the II Corps had been driven from the West Woods, Greene was forced to retreat. His two brigades rallied behind the ridge line of the Mumma farm. They reformed but did not advance again. After the battle, General Greene commended Steinrook for his conduct in the battle.

== After Antietam ==
The XII Corps was not involved in the campaign leading to the Battle of Fredericksburg. It did participate in the Mud March. In between, Stainrook was back in brigade command from December 22, 1862, to January 3, 1863. When Maj. Gen. Joseph Hooker undertook the Chancellorsville Campaign in the spring of 1863, Stainrook's regiment was in the brigade of Brig. Gen. Thomas L. Kane in the 2nd Division of the XII Corps under Brig. Gen. John W. Geary. Geary's Division was heavily engaged at Chancellorsville. Stainrook commanded the brigade's skirmish line on May 1 near Hazel Grove, facing southward. On May 2, the XII Corps had to redeploy because of the flank attack launched by Stonewall Jackson on the XI Corps. By the end of the day, the division of Brig. Gen. Alpheus Williams was facing west, while Geary's Division faced south, both deployed the east of Hazel Grove. On May 3 and 4 XII Corps was positioned near the Chancellorsville House, receiving heavy fire from Confederate troops. Stainrook was killed on May 4, 1863, "while encouraging his men."
