= Stuart's Christmas Raid =

Date	December 27-29, 1862
Location	Northern Virginia 38°33′58.62″N 77°19′27.66″W
Result	Successful Confederate Raid

Belligerents
Confederate Cavalry	Various Union Supply Depots

Commanders and leaders
J.E.B. Stuart	Various

Units involved
3 Brigades of Cavalry; 1 Battery of Horse Artillery	Depot Detachments; 2nd Pennsylvania Cavalry; 17th Pennsylvania Cavalry
- Location within Virginia

Stuart's Christmas Raid was a cavalry raid in the American Civil War from December 27 to December 29, 1862, at the Union supply bases at Dumfries, Occoquan, and Burke's Station in Virginia.

After the Battle of Fredericksburg, General Robert E. Lee sent Major General J.E.B. Stuart to look for Union supply trains and depots. Stuart started his raid with 1,800 cavalry troopers and a battery of horse artillery. He split off one of his brigades towards Occoquan under Brigadier General Wade Hampton and took the other two brigades under Brigadier Generals Fitz Lee and W.H.F. Rooney Lee towards Dumfries.

The town was defended by Union Colonel Charles Candy with a force of infantry and cavalry from Ohio and Pennsylvania and a battery of light artillery. The Confederate troops attacked the Dumfries defenders from both the north and south, while the artillery shelled the town. Candy's forces were able to repel the attacks but several buildings in the town were destroyed.

Stuart continued towards Occoquan with his brigades to meet up with Hampton's brigade. Hampton, meanwhile had charged into Occoquan surprising the Union forces and captured several enemy soldiers.

On December 28, Fitz Lee's cavalry skirmished with the 2nd and 17th Pennsylvania Cavalry, driving them towards Selecman's Ford. The Horse Artillery quickly crossed the ford and destroyed the Union camp, killing 2 Union officers, wounding 10 enlisted men and capturing 100.

On December 29, Stuart's troopers captured Burke's Station in Fairfax County. After capturing the telegraph office, the troopers read Union telegraph dispatches giving them the disposition of Federal forces and the intentions of their commanders.

In this raid, Stuart's troopers captured horses and mules and wagonloads of supplies. Before heading back to his own lines, Stuart telegraphed the Union Quartermaster General Montgomery C. Meigs, "General Meigs will in the future please furnish better mules; those you have furnished recently are very inferior." This would be the last of Stuart's major raids of the war.

== Battle marker ==
There is a Virginia Department of Historic Resources marker on Fraley Boulevard (U.S. 1) north of Williamstown Drive in Prince William County.
