= Henry Heller (Medal of Honor) =

American military officer

- Born: c. 1841
- Died: December 14, 1895 (aged 53–54)
- Burial place: Kingscreek, Ohio
- Military career
- Allegiance: United States; Union
- Branch: United States Army; Union Army
- Rank: sergeant
- Units: Company A, 66th Ohio Infantry
- Conflicts: American Civil War
- Awards: Medal of Honor

Henry Heller (c. 1841 – December 14, 1895) was a Union Army sergeant during the American Civil War and a recipient of America's highest military decoration—the Medal of Honor—for his actions at the Battle of Chancellorsville in Virginia in May 1863.

== Medal of Honor citation ==
- Rank and organization: Sergeant, Company A, 66th Ohio Infantry.
- Place and date: At Chancellorsville, Va., May 2, 1863.
- Entered service at: Urbana, Ohio.
- Birth: Unknown.
- Date of issue: July 29, 1892.

Citation:

One of a party of 4 who, under heavy fire, voluntarily brought into the Union lines a wounded Confederate officer from whom was obtained valuable information concerning the position of the enemy.

== See also ==
- List of American Civil War Medal of Honor recipients: G–L
