= Battle of Cedar Mountain =

1862 battle of the American Civil War

Battle of Cedar Mountain (Battle of Slaughter's Mountain)
- Part of the American Civil War
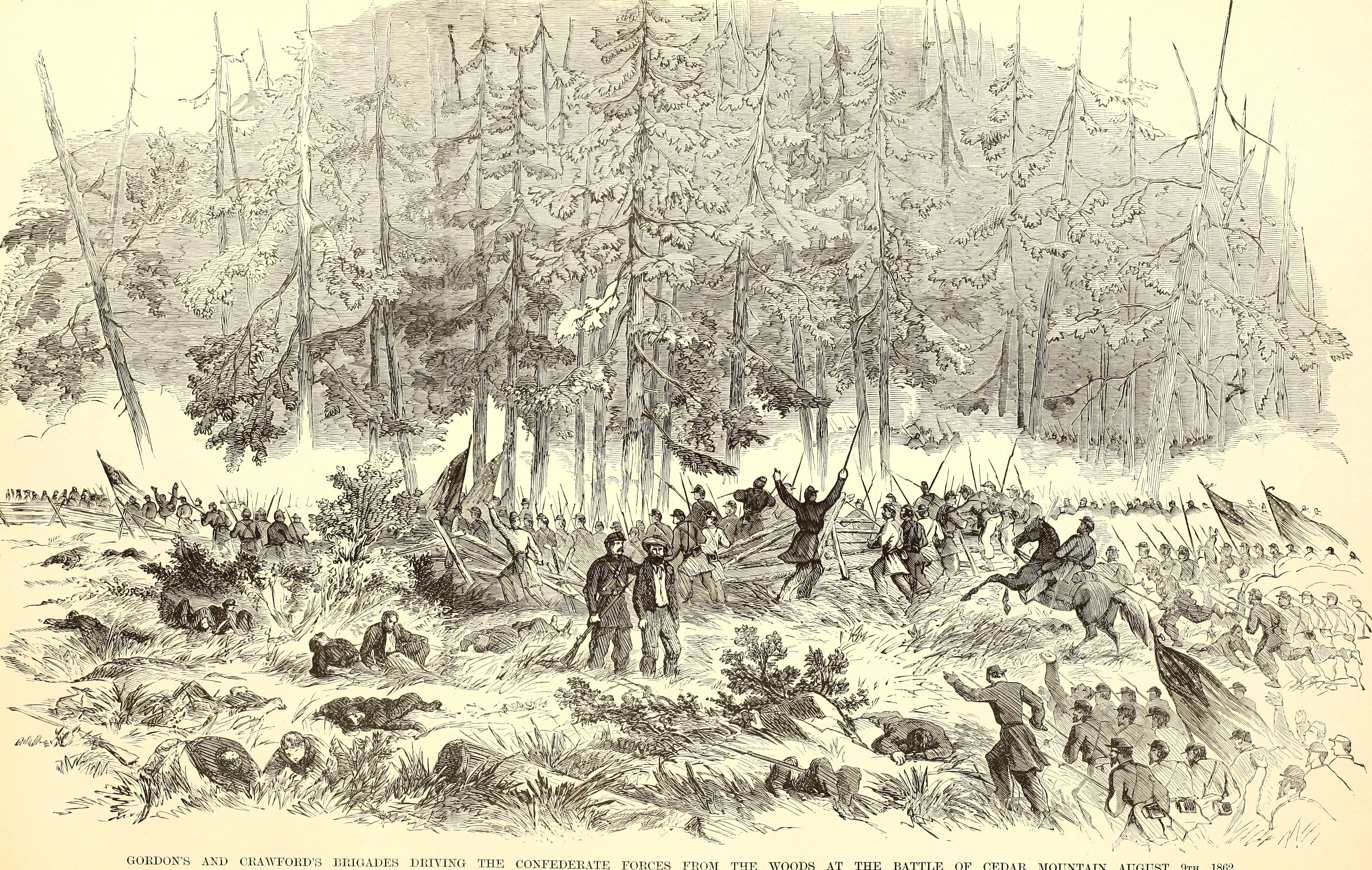
- Gordon's and Crawford's Brigades driving the Confederate forces from the woods at the Battle of Cedar Mountain, August 9, 1862. Frank Leslie's Illustrated Newspaper
| Date | August 9, 1862 |
| Location | Culpeper County, Virginia 38.40°N 78.07°W |
| Result | Confederate victory |

Belligerents
| United States | Confederate States |

Commanders and leaders
| Nathaniel P. Banks | Stonewall Jackson |

Units involved
| Army of Virginia | Army of Northern Virginia |

Strength
| 8,030 | 16,868 |

Casualties and losses
| 2,353 total: 314 killed 1,445 wounded 594 missing | 1,338 total: 231 killed 1,107 wounded |
- Location of the battle in Virginia

The Battle of Cedar Mountain, also known as Slaughter's Mountain or Cedar Run, took place on August 9, 1862, in Culpeper County, Virginia, as part of the American Civil War. Union forces under Maj. Gen. Nathaniel P. Banks attacked Confederate forces under Maj. Gen. Thomas J. "Stonewall" Jackson near Cedar Mountain as the Confederates marched on Culpeper Court House to forestall a Union advance into central Virginia. After nearly being driven from the field in the early part of the battle, a Confederate counterattack broke the Union lines resulting in a Confederate victory. The battle was the first combat of the Northern Virginia campaign.

== Background ==
On June 26, Maj. Gen. John Pope was placed in command of the newly constituted Union Army of Virginia. Pope deployed his army in an arc across Northern Virginia. Its right flank, under Maj. Gen. Franz Sigel, was positioned at Sperryville on the Blue Ridge Mountains, its center, under Maj. Gen Nathaniel P. Banks, was located at Little Washington and its left flank under Maj. Gen. Irvin McDowell was at Falmouth on the Rappahannock River. Part of Banks's corps, Brig. Gen. Samuel W. Crawford's brigade and Brig. Gen John P. Hatch's cavalry, were stationed 20 miles (32 km) beyond the Union line, at Culpeper Court House.

General Robert E. Lee responded to Pope's dispositions by dispatching Major General Thomas J. "Stonewall" Jackson with 14,000 men to Gordonsville on July 13. Jackson was later reinforced with another 10,000 men by Maj. Gen. A.P. Hill's division on July 27. (Note: This battle would be A.P. Hill's first time under the Jackson's command, and the personality clash between them would only end when Jackson was killed.) Lee intended to have Jackson strike Pope's Army of Virginia before the Army of the Potomac could reinforce them. On August 6, Pope marched his forces south into Culpeper County with the objective of capturing the rail junction at Gordonsville, in an attempt to draw Confederate attention away from Maj. Gen. George B. McClellan's withdrawal from the Virginia Peninsula.

In response to this threat, Jackson chose to go on the offensive, attacking Pope's vanguard under Banks, before the entire Army of Virginia could be brought to bear on his position at Gordonsville. After defeating Banks, he then hoped to move on Culpeper Court House, 26 miles (42 km) north of Gordonsville and the focal point of the Union arc about Northern Virginia, to keep Pope's army from uniting. This would allow Jackson to fight and hopefully defeat each of the Union Corps separately, as he had done during the Valley Campaign. Accordingly, Jackson set out on August 7 for Culpeper. As in his campaign in the Shenandoah in the spring, Jackson would maneuver nimbly enough to gain local numerical superiority in the coming action. The cavalry under Brig. Gen. Beverly Robertson was sent ahead to dispatch the Federal cavalry guarding the fords of the Rapidan River and occupying Madison Court House, threatening the Confederates' left flank as they marched northward. This task was easily accomplished by Robertson on August 8.

Jackson's march on Culpeper Court House was hindered by the severe heat wave over Virginia at the beginning of August, as well as by his characteristic secrecy about his plan, which caused confusion among his divisional commanders as to the exact route of advance. As such, the head of his column had only progressed 8 miles (13 km) by the evening of August 8. The Federal Cavalry, though easily dispatched by Robertson, quickly returned to Pope and alerted him of the Confederate advance. In response, Pope ordered Sigel to Culpeper Court House to reinforce Banks, and Banks was ordered to maintain a defensive line on a ridge above Cedar Run, 7 miles (11 km) south of Culpeper Court House.

Banks, still smarting from defeat by Jackson in the Valley, was anxious for revenge. Instead of fighting a defensive battle to buy time for the rest of the army's arrival, he planned to take the initiative and attack Jackson before he could fully form his lines, despite being outnumbered 2 to 1.

== Battle ==
=== Confederate position ===
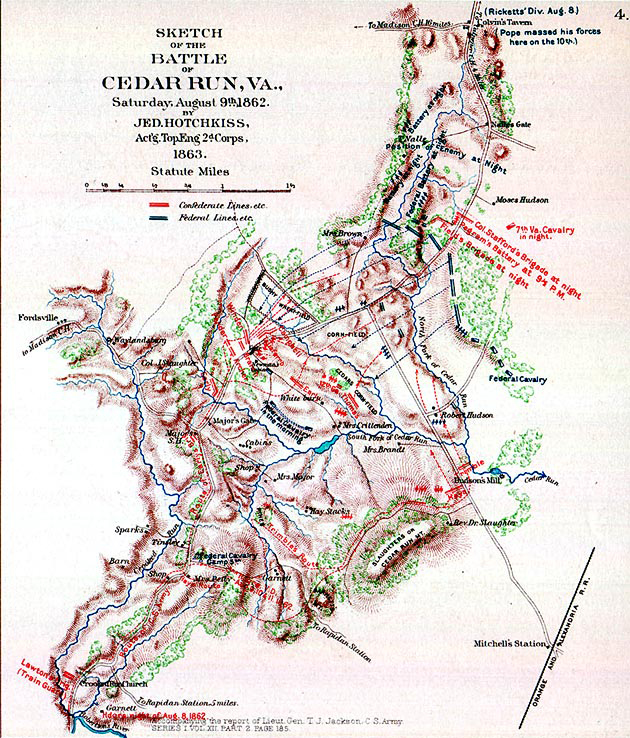
Sketch of Battle of Cedar Run

On the morning of August 9, Jackson's army crossed the Rapidan River into Culpeper County, led by Maj. Gen. Richard S. Ewell's division, followed by Brig. Gen. Charles S. Winder's division, with Maj. Gen. A.P. Hill's division in the rear. Just before noon, Brig. Gen. Jubal Early's brigade, the vanguard of Ewell's division, came upon Federal cavalry and artillery occupying the ridge above Cedar Run, just to the northwest of Cedar Mountain.

As stated above, Virginia was in the middle of an August heat wave. By 14:00, it was 98 °F (36.7 °C) and fighting did not commence until 15:30, the peak of the day's heat. Early in the contest, Jackson's army's movements were greatly hindered by this heat. The initial action consisted of a nearly two-hour artillery duel with neither side gaining a clear advantage. Some artillerymen suffered heat stroke as they frenetically fired their guns. The effective Federal artillery fire plunging around the Crittenden Gate had severely disrupted the Confederate deployment.

Early brought up his guns and an artillery duel began between the opposing forces as Early's infantry formed a line on the eastern side of the Culpeper-Orange Turnpike (which ran roughly parallel to present-day U.S. Route 15) on the high ground on the opposite bank of Cedar Run. As the rest of Ewell's division arrived they formed on Early's right, anchored against the northern slope of the mountain and deployed their six guns on its ridge. Winder's division formed to Early's left, on the west side of the Turnpike, with Brig. Gen. William Taliaferro's brigade closest to Early, and Col. Thomas S. Garnett's on the far Confederate left in a wheat field at the edge of a woods. Winder's artillery filled a gap on the road between the two divisions. The Stonewall Brigade, led by Col. Charles R. Ronald, was brought up in support behind the guns. A.P Hill's division, still marching up the Turnpike, was ordered to stand in reserve on the Confederate left.

A little before 17:00, as the artillery fight began to wane, Confederate Brig. Gen. Charles S. Winder fell mortally wounded. (Note: Winder was killed by a gun in Hall's 2nd Maine Light Artillery Battery) He had been ill that day and was taken onto the field in an ambulance wagon. While attempting to direct his troops, he was struck by a shell fragment. Winder's left arm and side were torn to pieces, and he died a few hours later. As a result, command of the division devolved on William Taliaferro, who was completely ignorant of Jackson's battle plan. Dispositions on his part of the field were still incomplete; Garnett's brigade was isolated from the main Confederate line, with its flank dangerously exposed to the woods. The Stonewall Brigade was to have come up to support them, but remained a half mile distant behind the artillery.

Before leadership could properly be restored to the division the Union attack began.

=== Union position ===
The Federals formed a line on a ridge above Cedar Run, with Brig. Gen. Samuel W. Crawford's brigade forming the Union right in a field across from Garnett and Brig. Gen. Christopher C. Augur's division on the Union left to the east of the Turnpike. Brig. Gen. John W. Geary's brigade was anchored on the Turnpike opposing Taliaferro, while Brig. Gen Henry Prince's brigade formed the far left opposite Ewell. Brig. Gen. George S. Greene's understrength brigade (only two regiments) was kept in reserve in the rear.

=== Union attack ===
Due to Banks' effective artillery fire, many Southerners were still struggling to get into position when Banks sent his infantry forward. He led off with General Christopher Augur’s division, which launched an attack through the fields east of the Culpeper Road. Geary and Prince were sent against the Confederate right. The Federal advance was swift and threatened to break the Confederate line, prompting Early to come galloping to the front from Cedar Mountain where he was directing troop dispositions.

Augur sent his first two brigades in two massive lines forward through a thick cornfield. (Note: Geary's 1st Brigade was made of the 5th Ohio, the 7th Ohio, the 29th Ohio, and the 66th Ohioregiments. Prince's 2nd Brigade was made of the 3rd Maryland, the 102nd New York, the 109th Pennsylvania, the 111th Pennsylvania, the 8th US US Infantry regiments, and the 12th US Infantry Battalion.) Rebel batteries on his left on the slope of Cedar Mountain across the South Branch of Cedar Run opened up with solid shot into the blue ranks in the corn. (Note: This was Latimer's Virginia Battery of Ewell's Division which had moved with his two remaining brigades – Trimble’s and Forno’s, along the western slope of Cedar Mountain upon an elevated spot, about 200 feet above the valley.) The firing intensified as they neared the Confederates' line. The artillery kept up a galling fire. (Note: Jackson wrote "... which opened with marked effect upon the enemy’s batteries. For some two hours a rapid, and continuous fire of artillery was kept up on both sides. Our batteries were well served and damaged the enemy seriously.") A small depression and a split-rail fence shielded Early's men, and the Federals, fighting without much cover save for that offered by the cornstalks, were getting the worst of the shooting match including Augur himself who received a wound in the foot.

Early's stabilizing presence and the raking fire of the Confederate guns halted the Union advance on the Confederate right. On the left Crawford attacked Winder's division, sending three of his regiments (Note: These were COL George D. Chapman's 5th Connecticut, COL Dudley Donnelly's 28th New York, and COL Joseph Knipe's 46th Pennsylvania.) directly across the wheat field while six companies of the 3rd Wisconsin, from the brigade led by Brig. Gen. George Henry Gordon, advanced on Crawford's right flank through an overgrown bushy field just west of the wheat field. Crawford's assault rapidly crossed the wheat field while the attention of Garnett's men was occupied by Geary and Prince's attack on the Confederate right. The Federals crashed into the woods directly into the flank of the 1st Virginia Infantry Battalion, who under the pressure from attack on two fronts broke for the rear. The Federals pushed on, not waiting to reform their lines, rolling through the outflanked 42nd Virginia until they found themselves in Taliaferro's and the artillery's rear. Just as Crawford's assault had begun, the Stonewall Brigade had come up on Garnett's left and formed their line along the southern end of the bushy field.

A gap, however, still remained between the Stonewall Brigade and Garnett's Brigade and Crawford's men streamed through the gap. Taliaferro had sent the 10th Virginia, from his own brigade, to help support Garnett's left, but they too were rapidly forced to withdraw. Unaware of the disaster to his right, Col. Ronald ordered the Stonewall Brigade forward in the bushy field, routing the vastly outnumbered 3rd Wisconsin in a matter of minutes. About to pursue the retreating Federals, Ronald suddenly learned the right flank of his brigade, held by the 27th Virginia, had fled when they discovered Crawford's men in the woods to their right and rear. Jackson ordered the batteries withdrawn before they could be captured, but Taliaferro and Early's left were hit hard by the Crawford's advance and threatened to break.

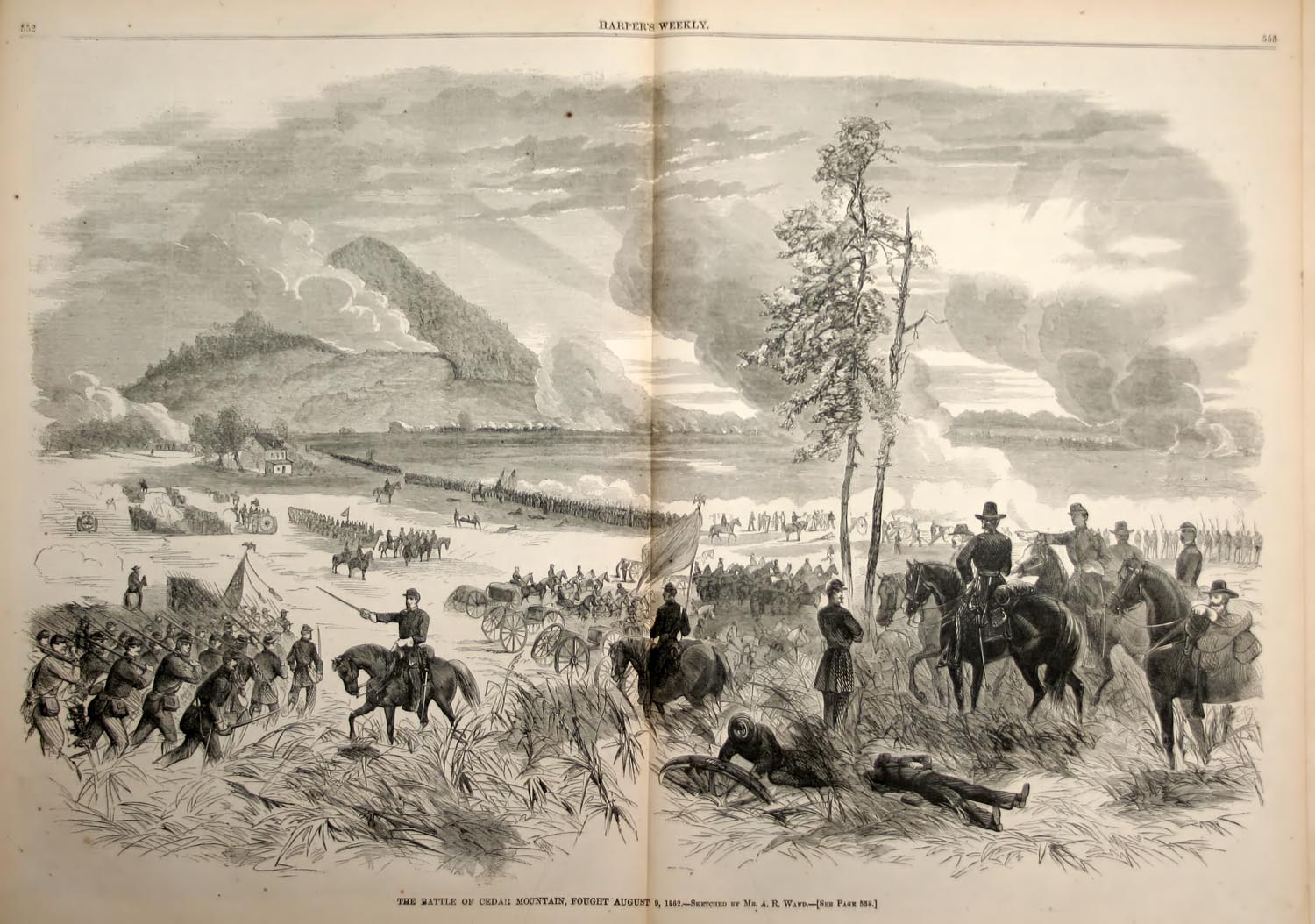
Engraving of the Battle of Cedar Mountain, August 9, 1862, from a sketch by Alfred R. Waud

=== Confederate counterattack ===
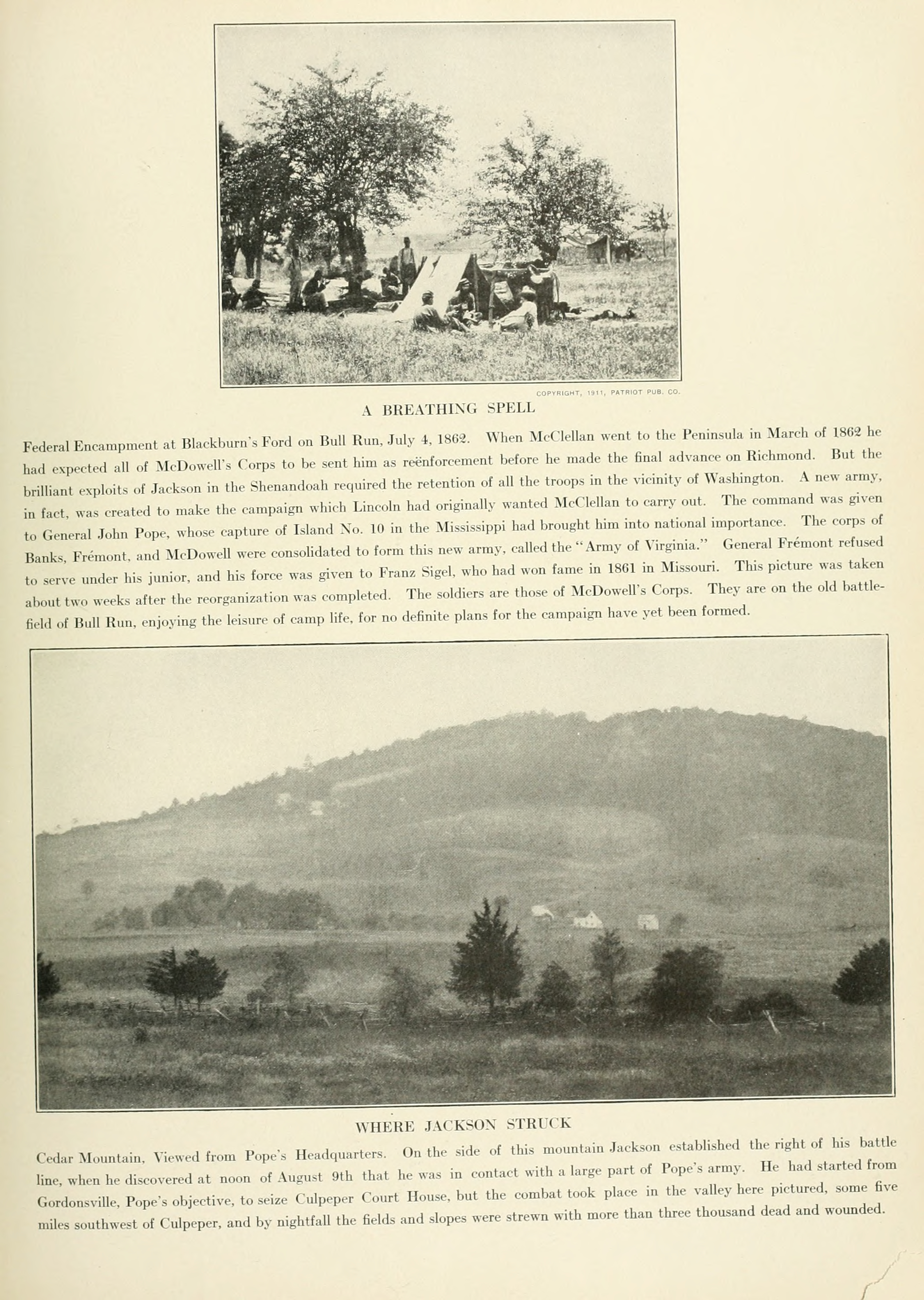
A photograph showing Cedar Mountain in the distance. This photograph was taken from near the location of Pope's headquarters, located in the center-left of the union line. In the late stages of the battle, Ewell's division formed on the slopes of the mountain and attacked towards the location of the camera, in the unionist center, and routed the union army.

At this dire point, Gen. Jackson rode to that part of the field to rally the men and came upon members of the 27th Virginia, part of what had once been his old brigade. Intending to inspire the troops there, he attempted to brandish his sword; however, due to the infrequency with which he drew it, it had rusted in its scabbard and he was unable to dislodge it. (Note: Cedar Mountain was the only battle in which Stonewall Jackson ever drew his sword.) Undaunted, he unbuckled the sword from his belt and waved it, scabbard and all, over his head. He then grabbed a battle flag from a retreating standard bearer and yelled at his men to rally around him. The rallied troops joined with advancing reinforcements from Maj. Gen. A.P. Hill's division to blunt Crawford's advance. Meanwhile, having learned of the collapse of Garnett's position and the rout of the 27th Virginia, Col. Ronald ordered the Stonewall Brigade's remaining four regiments to wheel to the right, bringing their battle line into the western end of the wheat field in Crawford's rear. Under pressure in their front from fresh troops of Brig. Gen. Lawrence O'Bryan Branch's brigade and with the Stonewall Brigade about to cut them off from the rest of the Union army, Crawford's men began streaming back through the wheat field. An advance by the 5th Virginia resulted in the capture of large numbers of Federals, as well as three Union battle flags. "Pen and thought combined cannot do this subject justice,” recalled a captain in the 5th Connecticut. “It was as if the men had deliberately walked into a fiery furnace and I only wonder how many escaped from certain death upon that field.” Crawford ordered his final reserve regiment, the 10th Maine, to hold off the Confederates long enough for the rest of the brigade to withdraw. Standing alone against elements of three Confederate brigades, the 461 man regiment lost 179 men in a fight that some survivors claimed lasted as little as five minutes.

With the Union right flank disintegrating, Gordon was ordered to advance his brigade, including the now-reformed elements of the 3rd Wisconsin routed earlier during the fight in the bushy field with the Stonewall Brigade. Establishing their position line along the tree line on the northern edge of the wheat field, Gordon's three regiments held against attacks by the Stonewall Brigade, Branch's Brigade, and additional reinforcements under Brig. Gen. James Archer. The Confederates, however, were only holding Gordon's attention while additional fresh troops worked their way west around Gordon's right flank. With little warning, parts of the Stonewall Brigade and the brigade led by Brig. Gen. William D. Pender smashed into the flank of the 27th Indiana. The advancing Confederates “blazed a withering volley into the faces of our men on the right,” recalled one of the Indiana soldiers. “Following the volley they charged literally into the midst of [the 27th Indiana's flank companies] and, at the point of the bayonet, demanded their surrender.” Gordon's line was quickly rolled up from right to left and his men streamed for the rear. Meanwhile, Jackson had ordered Ewell to advance as well. Ewell, having difficulty silencing his guns, was delayed, but the Union left began to waver at the sight of Crawford's retreat and were finally broken by a charge down Cedar Mountain by Brig. Gen. Isaac R. Trimble's brigade.

=== Confederate pursuit ===
Despite bringing up Greene's reserve brigade in support, by 19:45 the Union line was in full retreat. In a last-ditch effort to help cover his infantry's retreat, Banks sent two squadrons of cavalry at the Confederate line. They were met with a devastating volley from the Confederate infantry posted behind a fence on the road, allowing only 71 of 174 to escape. The Confederate infantry and Brig. Gen William E. Jones's 7th Virginia Cavalry hotly pursued the retreating Federals, nearly capturing Banks and Pope, who were at their headquarters a mile behind the Federal line. After a mile-and-a-half of pursuit, Jackson grew wary as darkness set in, as he was unsure of the location of the rest of Pope's army. Finally, several Union infantrymen captured by the 7th Virginia Cavalry informed the Confederates that Pope was bringing Sigel forward to reinforce Banks. Accordingly, Jackson called off the pursuit, and by around 22:00, the fighting had ceased. By this point, Brig. Gen. James Ricketts's division of McDowell's corps was arriving, which effectively covered Banks's retreat.

== Aftermath ==
Losses were high in the battle: Union casualties of 2,353 (314 killed, 1,445 wounded, 594 missing), Confederate 1,338 (231 killed, 1,107 wounded). Crawford's brigade had lost over 50% of its total strength, including most of its officers. Prince's and Geary's brigades suffered 30–40% casualty rates. Both generals were wounded, and Prince was also captured. Brig. Gen. Winder was mortally wounded by a shell.

Clara Barton conducted her first field work after the battle. While she cared for wounded soldiers in Washington, D.C., and on the battlefield after the First Bull Run, the Department of the Army only authorized her to visit the front lines on August 3, 1862. After her arrival on August 13, Barton spent two days and nights on the battlefield tending to the wounded, including Confederate prisoners.

For two days, Jackson maintained his position south of Cedar Run on the western slope of the mountain, waiting for a Federal attack that did not come. Lest further setbacks with Jackson on the loose, wreaking havoc, Union General-in-Chief Henry Halleck halted Pope’s advance on Gordonsville thereby surrendering initiative to Lee. With Pope now on the defensive, Lee could unleash his forces more broadly upon Pope. Finally, receiving news that all of Pope's army had arrived at Culpeper Court House, on August 12, Jackson fell back on Gordonsville to a more defensive position behind the Rapidan River. The battle effectively shifted fighting in Virginia from the Virginia Peninsula into northern Virginia.

Weather and poor communication with his divisional commanders had robbed Jackson of the initiative in the fight. Still expecting to face the same cautious opponent from the valley, he was taken by surprise and very nearly driven from the field. Excellent commanding by the Confederates at the crucial moment of the battle and the fortuitous arrival of Hill staved off defeat, eventually allowing their numerical superiority to drive the Federals from the field. For his part, Banks, having been soundly defeated by Jackson in the valley, was anxious to make up for previous losses. Rather than fighting a defensive battle from a strong position because he was outnumbered two to one, giving time for the rest of Pope's army to arrive, he decided to take the initiative and attack Jackson before he could fully form his lines. The bold move very nearly paid off, but in the end he was again defeated by his old foe.

== Battlefield preservation ==
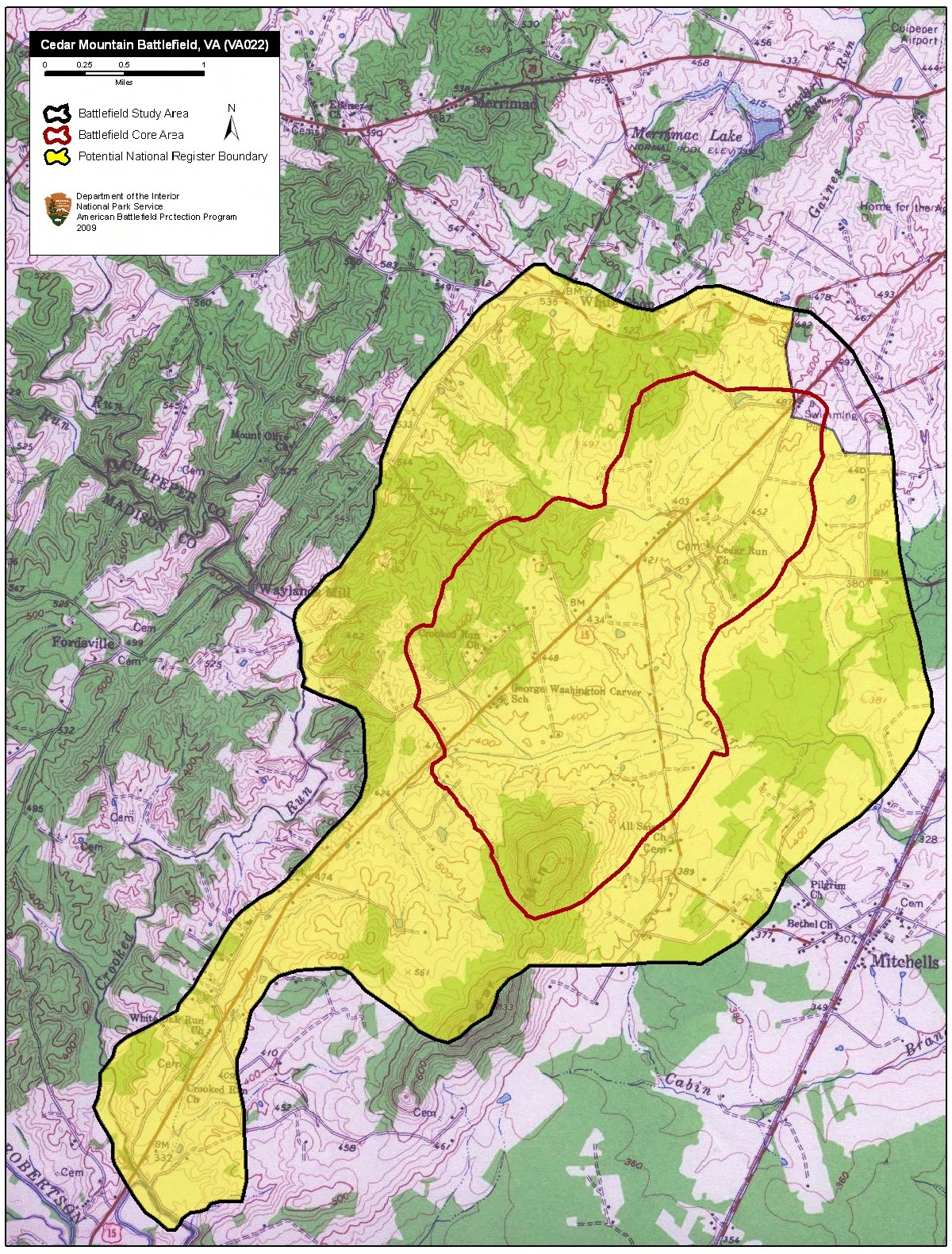
Map of Cedar Mountain Battlefield core and study areas by the American Battlefield Protection Program

The American Battlefield Trust and its partners have acquired and preserved 629 acres (255 ha) of the battlefield as of mid-2023. This includes the acquisition of about 45 acres in July 2022.

Most of the already preserved land sits near the intersection of Virginia State Routes 15 and 657 (the latter of which is known as General Winder Road). It includes the area where Crittenden Gate once stood, along with the wheat field in which some of the bloodiest fighting of the battle took place. The Trust preserved a 152 acres (62 ha) plot of land there in 1998, added two more to that total twelve years later and ten more by 2013. A local organization known as the Friends of Cedar Mountain Battlefield proved instrumental to implementing these preservation efforts.

The ten acres saved in 2012 are close to Crittenden Gate site and included the area of the battlefield where General Winder was mortally wounded, along with the locations of Jackson's command post and his desperate effort to rally Confederate troops at the climax of the battle.

== See also ==
- Culpeper National Cemetery
