= XII Corps (Union army) =

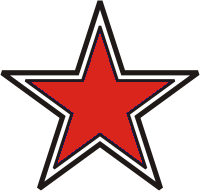
- XII Corps, 1st Division Badge
- Active: 1862–1864
- Country: United States of America
- Branch: Union Army
- Type: Corps
- Role: Headquarters
- Part of: Army of the Potomac
- Engagements: First Battle of Kernstown; First Battle of Winchester; Battle of Cedar Mountain; Battle of Antietam; Battle of Chancellorsville; Battle of Gettysburg; Battle of Wauhatchie; Battle of Lookout Mountain

Commanders
- Notable commanders: Joseph K. Mansfield; Alpheus S. Williams; Henry W. Slocum

The XII Corps (Twelfth Army Corps) was a corps of the Union Army during the American Civil War.

The corps was formed by U.S. War Department General Order of March 13, 1862, under which the corps organization of the Army of the Potomac was first created. By that order, five different corps were constituted: one of which, composed of the divisions of Alpheus S. Williams and James Shields and commanded by Maj. Gen. Nathaniel P. Banks, was designated as the V Corps. These divisions were then operating in the Shenandoah Valley. On June 26, President Abraham Lincoln ordered that "the troops of the Shenandoah Department, now under General Banks, shall constitute the Second Army Corps" of the Army of Virginia. On September 12, General Order 129, it was ordered that its designation be changed to that of the XII Corps and that Maj. Gen. Joseph K. Mansfield be placed in command.

The XII Corps was small—only two divisions instead of the customary three—but was composed of seasoned soldiers. Among its regiments were the 2nd Massachusetts, 7th Ohio, 5th Connecticut, 13th New Jersey, 107th New York, 28th Pennsylvania, 46th Pennsylvania, 3rd Wisconsin.

== The Valley and Antietam ==
The corps had done considerable hard fighting under its former title. Shields's Division won a victory over Thomas J. "Stonewall" Jackson at Kernstown on March 23, and Williams' Division fought well at Winchester, May 25, while on Banks' retreat. The Battle of Cedar Mountain was also fought by this corps, alone and unassisted; and, although defeated by the overwhelming force of the enemy, the record shows that the two divisions did some of the best fighting of the war there. In that battle the divisions were commanded by Generals Williams and Christopher C. Augur; loss, 302 killed, 1,320 wounded, and 594 missing; total, 2,216, out of less than 6,000 engaged. This loss fell on four brigades, Samuel W. Crawford's Brigade losing 867 men out of 1679, reported by Crawford as "present in engagement". The corps spent the Second Battle of Bull Run at Bristoe Station and did not participate in that engagement.

During the Maryland Campaign, the corps was formally added to the Army of the Potomac and renamed the XII Corps. Nathaniel Banks was relieved of command and replaced by Joseph K. Mansfield, an old Regular Army veteran with 40 years of service. Its division and brigade organization were the same as at Cedar Mountain; Brig. Gen. George S. Greene had succeeded Augur in the command of the 2nd Division. Its depleted columns had been strengthened by the accession of five new regiments of volunteers fresh from the North, three of which were composed of Pennsylvanians enlisted for nine months only. The corps now numbered 12,300 present for duty, including the non-combatants; it contained 22 regiments of infantry and three batteries of light artillery. It was the smallest corps in the army.

It was not engaged at South Mountain, although it marched in plain view of the battle that was raging on the mountain's side, ahead of its dusty columns. At the Battle of Antietam, it entered the fight early in the morning, and carried a position near, and in front of, the Dunker Church. General Mansfield fell, mortally wounded, while deploying his columns in the East Woods, and the command of the corps during the battle devolved on General Williams. The two divisions lost in this battle, 275 killed, 1,386 wounded, and 85 missing; total, 1,746 out of about 8,000 present in action.

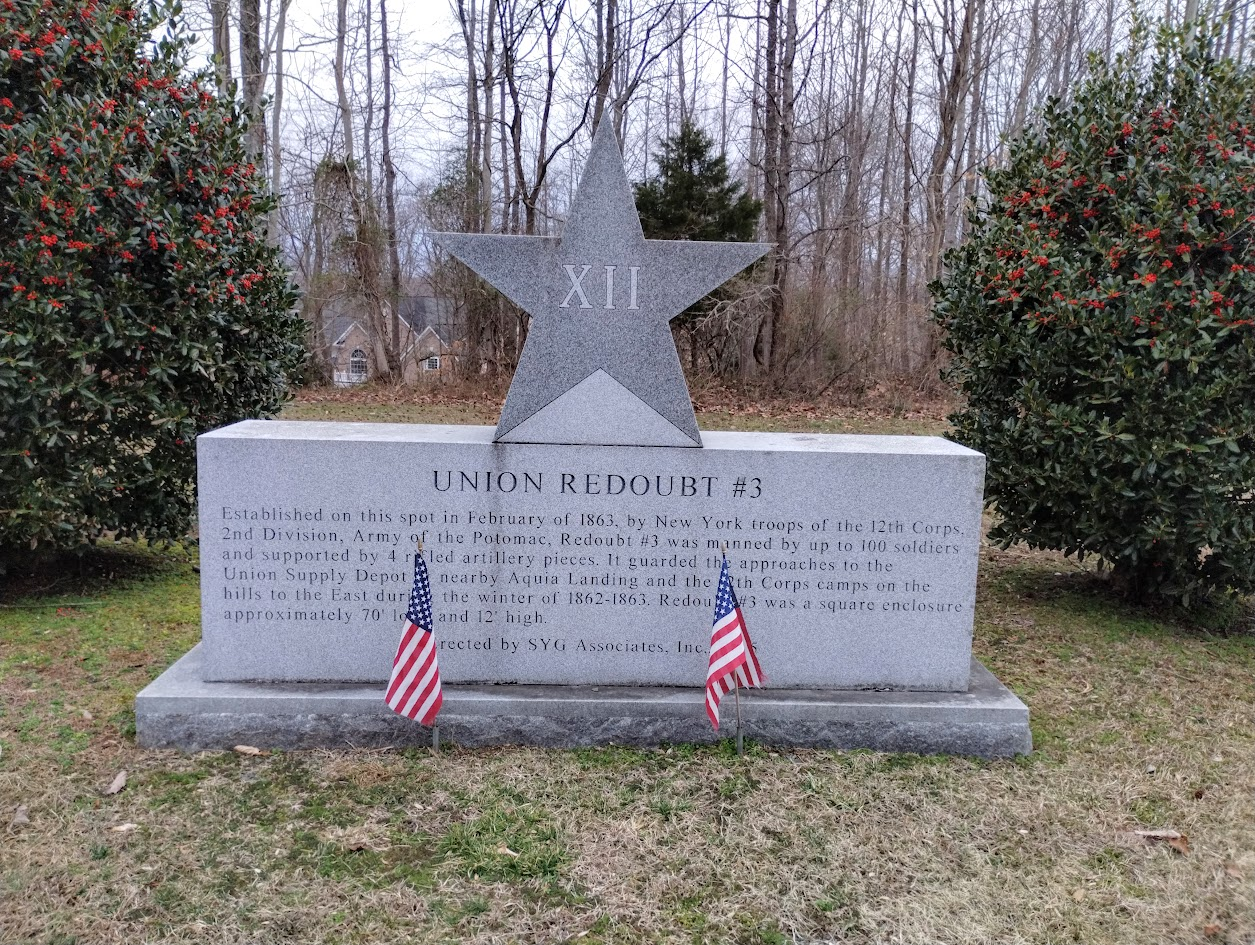
Site of XII Corps Redoubt #3, overlooking Aquia Landing, Virginia, February 2024 (located about one mile east of national historic site Redoubt No. 2).

The vacancy caused by the death of General Mansfield was filled by the appointment of Maj. Gen. Henry W. Slocum, a division commander of the VI Corps, who had already achieved a brilliant reputation by his services on in the Peninsula Campaign, and at the successful storming of Crampton's Gap. The XII Corps spent the Battle of Fredericksburg at Harper's Ferry and was not involved in that battle. The corps went into winter quarters at Stafford Court House.

== Chancellorsville and Gettysburg ==
The brunt of the Battle of Chancellorsville fell on the XI and XII Corps; and yet amid all the rout and confusion of that disastrous battle the regiments of the XII Corps moved steadily with unbroken fronts, retiring at the close of the battle without the loss of a color, while the corps artillery, after having been engaged in the close fighting at the Chancellor House, withdrew in good order, taking every gun with them. In this campaign Slocum's troops were the first to cross the Rapidan River, and the last to re-cross the Rappahannock River. The corps at this time contained 30 regiments of infantry, with five batteries of light artillery, numbering in all 19,929 present for duty. Its losses at Chancellorsville amounted to 260 killed, 1,436 wounded, and 1,118 missing; total, 2,814. The hardest fighting and heaviest losses fell on the brigades of Brig. Gen. Thomas H. Ruger and Col. Charles Candy. The divisions were commanded by Generals Williams and John W. Geary.

At the Battle of Gettysburg, the XII Corps distinguished itself by its gallant defense of Culp's Hill on July 2–3, 1863. General Slocum was in command of the right wing at Gettysburg, which left Alpheus S. Williams, of the 1st Division, in command of the corps; Thomas H. Ruger of the 3rd Brigade, 1st Division, took Williams's place as commander of the division; Geary commanded the 2nd Division.

On the afternoon of July 2 the corps was ordered by army commander George G. Meade to disengage from Culp's Hill and reinforce the Union line on its extreme left flank, near Little Round Top. Slocum persuaded Meade to leave one brigade behind to hold the critical position: Greene's Brigade, of Geary's Division. While occupying this position on Culp's Hill, with an excessively long line to defend and no other troops in support, Greene was attacked by Edward "Allegheny" Johnson's Division, but his brigade successfully repulsed the attack. A civil engineer, Greene insisted that his men prepare impressive defensive works on the hill. Still, some of Johnson's troops effected, without opposition, a lodgment in the vacated breastworks of the XII Corps, and upon the return of those troops a desperate battle ensued to drive the Confederates out. After a long, hard fight the corps succeeded in re-occupying its works. On no part of the field did the Confederate dead lie thicker than in front of the XII Corps position. Johnson's Division, containing 22 regiments, lost in this particular action, 229 killed, 1,269 wounded, and 375 missing; total, 1,873. To this must be added the losses suffered in the 14 regiments from the brigades of William Smith, Junius Daniel, and Edward A. O'Neal, which were sent to Johnson's support. The XII Corps, containing 28 regiments, lost 204 killed, 810 wounded, and 67 missing; total, 1,081.

== Tennessee ==
After the Gettysburg campaign, the Army of the Potomac pursued Robert E. Lee into Virginia, the XII Corps joining in the pursuit, pushing forward until it reached the Rappahannock. While encamped there, on September 23, 1863, the XI and XII corps were detached from the army and ordered to Tennessee as a reinforcement for William Rosecrans, besieged in Chattanooga. The two corps were placed under the command of Maj. Gen. Joseph Hooker. Arriving in Tennessee, Geary's Division moved to the front, while Williams's Division was stationed along the railroad from Murfreesboro to Bridgeport. Geary pushed on to effect a junction with the beleaguered army at Chattanooga. On the night of October 27, his division bivouacked in Lookout Valley, in an advanced and isolated position, where he was attacked at midnight by a part of James Longstreet's command. But Geary had taken proper precautions against surprise, and Longstreet was repulsed, Geary receiving in this affair a prompt and gallant support from part of the XI Corps. General George H. Thomas, commanding the Army of the Cumberland, stated in his official report that "the repulse by Geary's Division of greatly superior numbers who attempted to surprise him, will rank among the most distinguished feats of arms of this war."

The midnight Battle of Wauhatchie was followed in the next month by the brilliant victory at Lookout Mountain, where the 2nd Division fought its famous "battle above the clouds". Geary was assisted in this engagement by Walter C. Whitaker's Brigade of the IV Corps. One of Whitaker's regiments, the 8th Kentucky, was the first to plant its flag on the mountain's summit.

== Redesignation ==
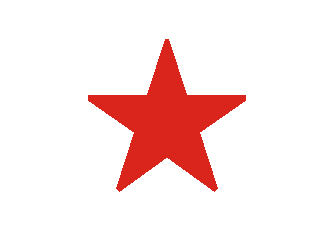
Union Army 1st Division Badge, XII Corps

In April 1864, the designation of the corps was changed to that of the XX Corps. Generals Williams and Geary still retained command of their divisions and the men still wore their XII Corps badge. This badge (a five-pointed star, or pentagram) was adopted by the reorganized corps. The new organization was formed by the consolidation of the XI and XII corps, to which was added some minor commands. This action of the War Department was based on the small sizes of the two corps: the XI had been extremely damaged at Gettysburg and the XII had always been the smallest in the army. Nonetheless, the soldiers of the XII Corps were very upset at the loss of their original corps identity.

Upon the discontinuance of the XII Corps, General Slocum was assigned to the command of the District of Vicksburg, but resumed the corps command—of the XX Corps—during the Atlanta campaign, General Hooker having been relieved. Slocum afterwards commanded the Army of Georgia while on the March to the Sea and in the Carolinas campaign.

== Command history ==
As V Corps

Nathaniel P. Banks	March 13, 1862 – 4 April 1862

As Department of the Shenandoah

Nathaniel P. Banks	4 April 1862 – 26 June 1862

As II Corps Army of Virginia

Nathaniel P. Banks	26 June 1862 – 12 September 1862

As XII Corps

Alpheus S. Williams	September 12, 1862 – September 15, 1862
Joseph K. Mansfield	September 15, 1862 – September 17, 1862
Alpheus S. Williams	September 17, 1862 – October 20, 1862
Henry W. Slocum	October 20, 1862 – July 1, 1863
Alpheus S. Williams	July 1, 1863 – July 4, 1863
Henry W. Slocum	July 4, 1863 – August 31, 1863
Alpheus S. Williams	August 31, 1863 – September 13, 1863
Henry W. Slocum	September 13, 1863 – September 25, 1863
* Henry W. Slocum	September 25, 1863 – April 18, 1864

* Corps assigned to the Army of the Cumberland; other entries assigned to the Army of the Potomac

After April 18, 1864, the divisions of the XII Corps became part of the XX Corps.

== External References ==
- Eicher, John H., and Eicher, David J., Civil War High Commands, Stanford University Press, 2001, ISBN 0-8047-3641-3.
- Fox, William F., Regimental Losses in the American Civil War, reprinted by Morningside Bookshop, Dayton, Ohio, 1993, ISBN 0-685-72194-9.
