= Charles Saalmann =

Union Army officer and vintner

Capt. Charles Saalmann
- Born: April 25, 1836; Breckerfeld, Prussia
- Died: February 21, 1909 (aged 72); Mullica Township, Atlantic Co., New Jersey
- Burial place: Egg Harbor City Cemetery, Egg Harbor City, New Jersey
- Military career
- Allegiance: USA (Union)
- Service years: 1862–1865
- Rank: Captain; Acting Commissary of Subsistance
- Units: Army of the Potomac, XI Corps; Army of the Cumberland, XX Corps
- Conflicts: American Civil War; Cross Keys; Freeman's Ford; Second Bull Run; Chancellorsville; Gettysburg; Wauhatchee; Resaca; Pumpkinvine Creek/ New Hope Church; Kolb's Farm; Peach Tree Creek; Siege of Atlanta; Savannah Campaign; Carolinas Campaign
- Other work: Vintner; Township Elected Official

Charles Daniel Saalmann (April 25, 1836 – February 21, 1909) was a captain of Union infantry during the American Civil War. He was wounded at Gettysburg and acted as a Commissary of Subsistence during General William T. Sherman's famed March to the Sea. After the war, he established the Black Rose Vineyard near Egg Harbor City, New Jersey. As a vintner, he produced claret wines that received medals at international competitions.

== Early life ==
Saalmann was born on April 25, 1836, in Breckerfeld, Ennepe-Ruhr-Kreis, Westphalia, Prussia. The small town of Breckerfeld straddles a plateau nine miles south of the Ruhr River. Saalmann's father, Daniel (1788–1865) was a surgeon in Breckerfeld. His mother, Charlotte Dorfmueller (1795–1878) came from nearby Hulscheid. Saalmann was the last of nine children.

== Marriage and family ==
Saalmann married 18-year-old Emilie Schulte, on June 29, 1860, in the village of Wiblingwerde, eight miles to the northwest of Breckerfeld. Leaving Emilie behind temporarily, Saalmann emigrated to America. He had arrived in Philadelphia by the summer of 1861. Emilie came to the United States shortly thereafter, and lived in Elizabeth, New Jersey, during Saalmann's participation in the American Civil War.

The couple would eventually have three children, all born after the close of the Civil War. Charles Daniel Saalmann was born on May 22, 1866, William Gustavus Saalmann was born on November 19, 1867, and Emilie Charlotte Henrietta Saalmann was born on May 20, 1868.

== Civil War service ==
Saalmann enrolled as a private in the Union Army on August 9, 1861. He joined the 75th Pennsylvania Volunteer Infantry Regiment, which was composed mainly of German-speaking residents of Philadelphia. At the time of enlistment, Saalmann stood 5'8" tall and had grey eyes, light hair and a light complexion. On August 21, he was promoted to second lieutenant.

Henry Bohlen, a wealthy Philadelphia liquor merchant, recruited and financed the regiment and became its colonel. The 75th Pennsylvania was fitted out at Camp Worth, in Hestonville, West Philadelphia. On September 25, Saalmann and the other men of the regiment boarded a train bound for the nation's capital. After arriving in Washington D.C., they crossed the Potomac River on the Long Bridge and went into winter camp in the defenses of the capital.

=== Operations in Shenandoah Valley and vicinity ===
Beginning on March 10, 1862, the 75th Pennsylvania participated in the advance on Manassas. By March 26, the regiment had arrived in Warrenton Junction, where the troops suffered severely from want of provisions. On April 15, 53 men from the regiment drowned in a ferry accident on the Shenandoah River. The troops reached Winchester, Virginia, on April 18.

During May 1862, the regiment was sent into West Virginia, where the men endured difficult marches and periods of near-starvation. On Sunday, June 8, after reemerging into the Shenandoah Valley, the 75th Pennsylvania participated in the Battle of Cross Keys near Harrisonburg. The regiment sustained several losses and was ordered to retreat before it could deploy in a satisfactory manner.

On August 11, Saalmann was promoted from Second Lieutenant to First Lieutenant, and was transferred from Company C to Company D. On August 22, the 75th Pennsylvania participated in a skirmish at Freeman's Ford on the Rappahannock River. The regiment's former commander, Henry Bohlen, who had by then been promoted to Brigadier General, was killed during this fighting.

=== Second Bull Run ===
On the first day of the Second Battle of Bull Run, August 29, the 75th Pennsylvania was involved in an intense firefight centered around an unfinished railroad embankment. During this fighting, Captain Roderick Theune, Saalmann's immediate commander, and Captain Schwartz, Saalmann's former commander, were both seriously wounded.

During day two of Second Bull Run the 75th Pennsylvania seized and held the crest of a hill. However, it was ultimately driven from this position and suffered serious losses. Following this Union defeat, the 75th Pennsylvania remained in the defenses of the nation's capital, near Centreville, Virginia. On September 2, 1862, Saalmann was forced to take a 30-day leave of absence as a result of typhoid fever. Thereafter, he was detailed for several months to Camp Banks, a facility for paroled prisoners.

=== Chancellorsville ===
By February 1863, Saalmann had rejoined the regiment at Stafford Court House, Virginia. In March of that year, he was promoted to captain and was assigned to lead Company C. At Chancellorsville, 75th Pennsylvania was part of the Eleventh Corps, which made up the western tip of the Army of the Potomac. On the evening of May 2, the regiment was overrun and routed by General Stonewall Jackson's surprise flank attack. Several men in Saalmann's company were killed and taken prisoner.

=== Gettysburg ===
On June 12, 1863, federal troops were ordered northward in response to a threatened confederate invasion of Maryland and Pennsylvania. On July 1, 1863, Saalmann and his company were hurried from Emmitsburg, Maryland, toward Gettysburg, Pennsylvania along the Taneytown Road. After passing through town, the men were arrayed in a line of battle near the Carlisle Road. A Confederate flanking maneuver and the collapse of adjacent regiments exposed the men to an enfilading fire that cut large gaps in the ranks.

Saalmann was felled by a bullet that passed through his upper left arm, partially fracturing the bone. He lay on the battlefield throughout the rest of the battle. On July 3, the defeated Confederate Army withdrew. Saalmann was treated in a field hospital by Surgeon Beeken, of the 75th Pennsylvania. He was among the first of the wounded evacuated. On July 7, he arrived in Philadelphia on a medical train. By September 16, Saalmann had rejoined the regiment.

=== Transfer to the Western Theater ===
During late summer 1863, much of the Union Army lay besieged in Chattanooga, Tennessee. To alleviate this situation, about 18,000 troops from the Army of the Potomac were transported to the Chattanooga area by train. Saalmann was among those transferred. In a complex movement that entailed several changes of trains and engines, the troops passed through Washington, D.C., Harper's Ferry, Maryland, Grafton, West Virginia, and Columbus, Ohio, before arriving in Indianapolis, Indiana. They then headed south, passing through Louisville, Kentucky, and Nashville, Tennessee, before arriving in Bridgeport, Alabama on October 2, 1863.

On the morning of October 29, the troops engaged in a rare night battle near Wauhatchie, Tennessee. During this clash, Saalmann was again wounded. However, there is no record of him being absent from the regiment. Between November 23 and 26, the regiment played a supporting role in the Battle of Chattanooga.

On November 28, 1763, the 75th Pennsylvania, as part of the Eleventh Corps, was ordered to proceed to the relief of General Burnside, who was under siege at Knoxville, Tennessee. After a difficult winter march, which took the troops eastward through Cleveland, Sweetwater, Philadelphia, Loudon, and Unitia, they arrived in Louisville, Tennessee, on December 5. There they learned that the siege had been lifted and they returned to the vicinity of Chattanooga.

=== Participation in the Atlanta Campaign ===
On January 1, 1864, Saalmann was detached from the 75th Pennsylvania and was appointed Acting Commissary of Subsistence of the brigade. Saalmann was thus attached to the Third Brigade of the First Division of the Twentieth Corps. On May 2, 1864, Colonel James S. Robinson took command of the Third Brigade. Robinson had fought close to Saalmann at Chancellorsville and Gettysburg.

Beginning on May 4, the brigade proceeded south down the Chattanooga Valley and, after entering Georgia, shifted east, and continued south through the Dogwood Valley and Snake Creek Gap. This was the beginning of General Sherman's Atlanta campaign. The brigade was heavily engaged during the Battle of Resaca, which took place from May 13 to the 15th. The men held the left of the Union line. By May 20 the brigade had reached Cassville, Georgia.

Twenty five miles further south, the brigade took part in the Battles of Pumpkin Vine Creek and New Hope Church, fought between May 26 and June 4, near Dallas, Georgia. It also participated in the Battle of Kolb's Farm, on June 22, where it repulsed a series of attacks, sustaining few casualties and inflicting severe losses on the enemy. After crossing the Chattahoochee River at Pace's Ferry on July 17, the brigade was engaged in heavy fighting during the Battle of Peach Tree Creek on July 20. This Union victory was followed by the five-week Siege of Atlanta. Victorious federal troops entered Atlanta on September 2.

=== Participation in Sherman's March to the Sea ===
On November 15, 1864, Sherman's Army marched east from Atlanta, with the ultimate objective being Savannah and the coast. The Third Brigade of the Twentieth Corps made up part of the right wing. The brigade passed through Decatur, Sheffield, Social Circle, Rutledge, Madison, Eatonton, Dennis Station, and Westover, before arriving at Milledgeville, then the capital of Georgia, on November 23.

As Commissary of Subsistence, Saalmann was responsible for accounting for and distributing foodstuffs and supplies gathered by foragers. Foraging parties typically consisted of about 50 men. These men, familiar with the intended route of the march, would set out before dawn on a course several miles to either side of the main column. They would then move between homesteads acquiring goods and would requisition wagons to convey these items inward to the main column. Successful foragers would wait beside the road, ready to deliver food, supplies, and livestock to the Commissary.

On November 24, the troops departed Milledgeville, heading east. The third brigade passed through Hebron, Sandersville, Tennille Station, Davisboro, Spier's Turnout, and Birdsville. The roll return for November 1864, places Saalmann at Little Ogeechee Creek, a few miles south of Louisville, Georgia. A few miles to the east of Birdsville, the men came upon Camp Lawton, a recently evacuated Confederate prisoner-of-war stockade. A skirmish occurred in the Monteith Swamp, about ten miles east of Savannah. Units of the Third Brigade flanked Confederate forces and drove them from their fortifications. On December 21, 1864, the Confederates abandoned Savannah.

=== The Carolinas Campaign and the end of the war ===
After arriving in Savannah, Saalmann took a leave of absence, traveling north by steamer to visit with his wife in New Jersey. On January 17, 1865, during Saalmann's leave, Robinson's brigade started northward through South Carolina at the beginning of the Carolinas campaign. Saalmann was eventually able to reconnect with the brigade in North Carolina, probably in Fayetteville.

On March 16, Sherman's right wing fought a battle at Averasboro, North Carolina. A more significant battle occurred three days later at Bentonville, North Carolina. Robinson's brigade was driven from its initial position when Confederate forces advanced in mass. However, Robinson rallied the troops at the Morris farm, where the men repulsed at least five Confederate charges. This Union victory was the last major battle of the war.

By April 13, 1865, the brigade to which Saalmann was attached had arrived in Raleigh, North Carolina. There the men received news of President Abraham Lincoln's death and the end of the war. On April 30, 1865, Robinson's brigade started for Washington, D.C., passing through the former Confederate capital of Richmond, Virginia. On May 23, at Alexandria, Virginia, Saalmann resigned his commission. The following day, he participated in the Grand Review in Washington, D.C.

== Postwar career ==
After the war, Charles Saalmann rejoined his wife and moved to the German enclave of Egg Harbor City, New Jersey. At the time, this town was home to several small vineyards. On July 1, 1865, Charles and Emilie Saalmann, for a sum of $2,000, purchased a property on Darmstadt Avenue to the west of town in adjacent Mullica Township. Saalmann cleared the land, planted grapes in this location, and founded the Black Rose Vineyard.

=== Associations and political activities ===
While living in Mullica Township, Saalmann was a member of the General Stahel Post of the Grand Army of the Republic (GAR) in Egg Harbor City. He attended one or more Gettysburg reunions. He delivered the oration at the 1895 Memorial Day celebration in Egg Harbor City. Saalmann measured rainfall for the federal government and issued detailed annual reports to the New Jersey Board of Agriculture. He was also a weather correspondent for the Bridgeton Evening News. A Republican in politics, Saalmann was active in local government serving as Mullica Township Treasurer, Committeeman, Freeholder, and as a member of the Mullica Township Board of Health.

=== The Black Rose Vineyard ===
During the late 1860s and 1870s, the culture of wine grapes in the area surrounding Egg Harbor City became a prominent industry. The region was known for producing distinctive red wines. In this respect, it differed from most other east coast wine growing areas, which focused on semi-sweet white wines. As the wines of Egg Harbor City received increased recognition, its vineyards flourished. By 1872, some 700 acres in the area were devoted to viniculture. Typically, purchasers would arrive by train on Friday from Philadelphia and New York, and would travel from one winery to another, choosing cases or kegs from particular wines and vintages.

Thomas Taylor, Microscopist with the United States Department of Agriculture, provided the following description of Saalmann's cultivation techniques after a trip to the vineyard in 1877:

The first vineyard visited was that of [Capt.] Chas. Saalmann, known as "Black Rose Vineyard." He ... has planted the following varieties: Norton's Virginia Seedling, Salem, Clevner, Ives, Concord, Martha and Taylor's Bullet. His entire vineyard was planted with great care, the whole being subsoiled two feet six inches deep, a method of culture highly approved by the Germans of this colony; by this method the soil of the vineyard is rendered homogenous .... His vines are all trained on poles, and are all fertilized with stable manure every year. A hole is dug say on the north side of the vine about two feet deep and tilled to within six inches of the top. Not more than two shovels full of manure are put in the hole. The following year a similar hole is dug on the south side of the vine, and the same process is followed on the west and east sides respectively during the succeeding two years. The object of this method of manuring is to distribute root growth. On making an examination of one of these manure deposits we found it filled with masses of tender rootlets. The surface of the vineyard is kept clear and free from all weeds and grass, and is ploughed each year six inches deep and within six inches of the vine stock. Mr. Saalman does not regard the removal of the surface roots as detrimental to the vines, but he considers a light yearly manuring and cultivation very essential to the production of fruit. The roots of all the varieties of grapes in this vineyard were in good condition.

While Saalmann produced several styles of wine, including bottles labeled 'Flower of Jersey,' 'Martha,' and 'Belli Rosa,' his premium offering was a claret under the label 'Black Rose.' This was a dry, full-bodied red wine composed primarily of pressings from the native 'Norton' grape. A Department of Agriculture analysis revealed that the 1877 vintage contained 12.31 percent alcohol. It characterized 'Black Rose' as a "sound agreeable 'Claret,' free from harmful or unwarrantable additions, moderately astringent, and well suited for medicinal use. It has evidently been carefully made and preserved." Based on the planted acreage of each cultivar, it appears likely that 'Black Rose' was composed of approximately two-thirds 'Norton,' one sixth 'Ives' and one sixth 'Clevner.'

During the late 1800s, the best examples of Norton-based wines from southern New Jersey competed on an equal footing with the great wines of Bordeaux and Burgundy and were consistently ranked at or near the top in international competitions. Saalmann's 'Black Rose,' won medals at regional competitions, at the Centennial Exposition in Philadelphia in 1876 and at the Exposition Universelle in Paris in 1878.

Saalmann erected two substantial brick and stone wine cellars on his property. These vaults were described as "the largest, constructed on the best modern plan for ventilation and temperature for the flavor and keeping of the wines, and cover an area of 30 x 72 feet. The stock carried is about 15,000 gallons, representing a value of $25,000, and sales are estimated at $5,000 per annum, the age of the vintage when sold being from five years up."

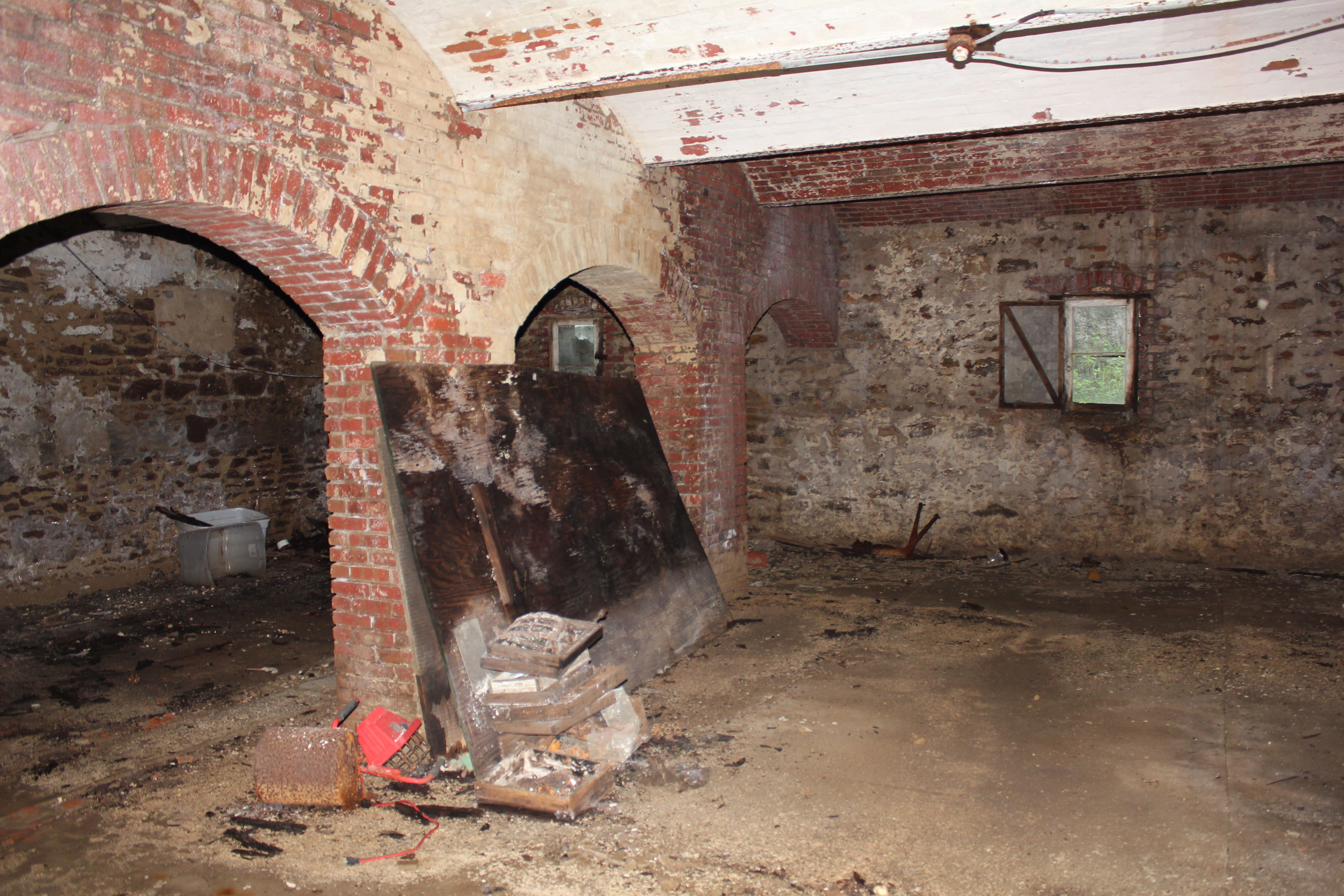
One of Capt. Saalmann's wine vaults as it appeared in July 2013

At about the turn of the century, Saalmann retired and turned the vineyard over to sons, Charles and William. However, Charles became involved with the temperance movement. The brothers abandoned the winery business and converted the winery into a vegetable farm.

== Death ==
After speaking at a friend's funeral, Charles Saalmann developed pneumonia and died on February 22, 1909, at age 72. He was survived by his wife and three children. His widow, Emilie, filed a declaration for a widow's pension on March 19, 1909. She died on January 2, 1915. Charles Saalmann is buried in Egg Harbor City Cemetery in Atlantic County, New Jersey.
