= 75th Pennsylvania Infantry Regiment =

Union Army infantry regiment

75th Regiment, Pennsylvania Volunteer Infantry
- Pennsylvania flag
- Active: October 1861 to September 1, 1865
- Country: United States
- Allegiance: Union
- Branch: Infantry
- Engagements: Battle of Cross Keys; First Battle of Rappahannock Station; Second Battle of Bull Run; Battle of Chancellorsville; Gettysburg campaign Battle of Gettysburg; Battle of Wauhatchie; Chattanooga campaign Battle of Franklin

The 75th Regiment Pennsylvania Volunteer Infantry was a unit of the Union Army during the American Civil War. It was composed almost entirely of German-speaking residents of Philadelphia and newly arrived German immigrants. Total enrollment, over the course of the war, was 1,293 officers and men. The 75th Pennsylvania participated in several major battles including Second Bull Run, Chancellorsville, and Gettysburg. The regiment was transferred to the Western Theater in September, 1863. There, it participated in operations in Tennessee, before it was mustered out of service on September 1, 1865, following the close of the war.

== Commanding officers ==
Colonel Henry Bohlen (August 7, 1861 – April 28, 1862, promoted to brigadier general)
Colonel Francis Mahler (April 1862 – July 1, 1863, killed at Gettysburg)
Major August Ledig (July 1, 1863 – March 8, 1864, assumed command after Mahler wounded at Gettysburg)
Lt. Colonel Alvin V. Matzdorff (March 8, 1864 – September 1, 1865, mustered out with regiment)

=== Company commanders ===
Company A – Capt. Julius Oswald (August 9, 1861 – July 28, 1862, resigned)
Capt. Reinhard Gerke (July 28, 1862 – September 1, 1865, mustered out with company)

Company B – Capt. August Sehmann (August 16, 1861 – October 6, 1864, mustered out when term expired)

Company C – Capt. Rudolph Schwartz (August 22, 1861 – November 5, 1862, discharged for wounds received at Second Bull Run)
Capt. Charles Saalmann (March 1, 1863 – May 28, 1865, detached from regiment as Acting Commissary of Subsistence to Third Brigade,
First Division, Twentieth Corps on January 1, 1864, participated in General Sherman's Atlanta and Savannah Campaigns, resigned at close of war).

Company D – Capt. Philip T. Schopp (August 27, 1861 – September 14, 1862, promoted to colonel)
Roderick Theune (June 26, 1862 – December 28, 1863, resigned)

Company E – Capt. August Ledig (August 9, 1861 – July 30, 1962, promoted to major)
Capt. Roswell G Feltue (September 1, 1861 – September 1, 1865, mustered out with company)

Company F – Capt. Gablenz Wolfgang (September 16, 1861 – August 14, 1862, resigned)
Capt. Frederick Oppman (August 14, 1862 – January 12, 1863, discharged)
Capt. Richard Ledig (March 1, 1862 – November 3, 1864, discharged for wounds received at Second Bull Run)

Company G – Capt. Adoph Shoeninger (September 25, 1861 – August 23, 1862, resigned)
Capt. Frederick Tiedemann (August 23, 1862 – September 15, 1863, resigned)
Capt. Franz Ehrlich (December 5, 1861 – September 1, 1865, mustered out with company)

Company H – Capt. August Sauer (October 9, 1861 – December 1, 1861, resigned)
Capt. Joseph S. Chandler (December 1, 1861 – September 18, 1862, promoted to major 114th Pennsylvania Infantry)
Capt. William Schindler (August 31, 1862 – July 3, 1864, resigned)

Company I – Capt. Frederick Winter (October 16, 1861 – September 1, 1865, mustered out with company)

Company K – Capt. Christian Wyck (August 9, 1861 – April 15, 1862, drowned in Shenandoah River)
Capt. Frederick Fromhagen (October 30, 1862 – April 9, 1863, resigned)

== Assignments ==
September 1861 – November 1861. Casey's Provisional Division, Army of the Potomac.
November 1861 – March 1862. Bohlen's 3rd Brigade, Blenker's Division, Army of the Potomac.
March 1862 – April 1862. Third Brigade, Blenker's Division, Second Corps, Army of the Potomac.
April 1862 – June 1862. Third Brigade, Blenker's Division, Mountain Department.
June 1862 – September 1862. Second Brigade, Third Division, First Corps, Army of Virginia.
September 1862 – October 1863. Second Brigade, Third Division, Eleventh Corps, Army of the Potomac.
October 1863 – April 1864. Third Brigade, Third Division, Eleventh Corps, Army of the Cumberland.
April 1864 – March 1865. Unattached, Fourth Division, 20th Army Corps, Department of the Cumberland.
March 1865 – September 1865. First Brigade, First Sub-District of Middle Tennessee.

== History ==
Organization

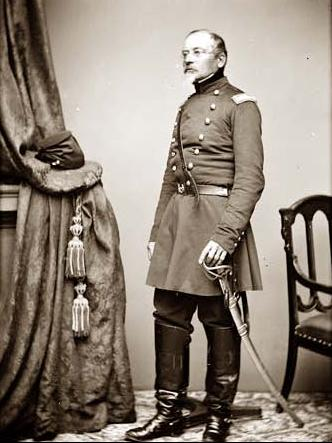
Henry Bohlen

Henry Bohlen, a wealthy Philadelphia liquor merchant, financed, recruited, and organized the 75th Pennsylvania (originally designated the 40th Pennsylvania) during August and September 1861. As his second in command, Bohlen selected 35-year-old, Francis Mahler. The regiment fitted out at Camp Worth in Hestonville in West Philadelphia. On September 25, 1861, the regiment, by then numbering about 800 men, departed camp on foot and marched to downtown Philadelphia. There, the unit was presented with its regimental and national colors. At midnight, the troops departed Philadelphia for Washington, D.C. by train.

Winter of 1861–1862

After arriving in the nation's capital, the 75th Pennsylvania crossed the Potomac by way of the Long Bridge and went into camp near Roach's Mills on Four Mile Run. In October, it moved into permanent winter quarters near Hunter's Chapel, Virginia. In November, 1861, the regiment was assigned to The Third Brigade of Louis Blenker's Division, composed primarily of German-American regiments. On November 22, the regiment participated in the review of the Army of Potomac at Bailey's Cross Roads by President Lincoln and General McClellan.

=== 1862 ===
Shenandoah Valley Operations

Beginning on March 10, 1862, the 75th Pennsylvania served as forward guard during the advance on Manassas, Virginia. The men passed through Annandale, Burke's Station, and Fairfax Courthouse. They then marched west to Centreville, Virginia, and, from there, continued through Newmarket, Manassas, Milford, Weaverville, and Cattlett Station. By March 26, the regiment had arrived in Warrenton Junction. During this march, the troops suffered severely from want of provisions and shelter. After passing through Upperville and Paris, the regiment was ordered across the Shenandoah River at Berry's Ferry. The river was swollen with melted ice and snow. A boat carrying troops from companies I and K capsized in mid river, resulting in the loss of 53 lives. The accident was described as follows:

On the 15th [the regiment] was ordered to cross the Shenandoah, and move to Winchester, in pursuit of Stonewall Jackson's force then confronting Banks. Several rafts were constructed to cross the troops. The river was high, and the current rapid. Company D, the skirmish company, crossed in safety, when, to save time, and old ferry boat which had been partly burned by the enemy, was repaired, and a rope stretched across the stream to guide it. Companies I and K embarked, and when near the middle of the stream, the boat swamped and suddenly began to sink. It was a moment of terror. A shriek of agony rent the air as they were suddenly engul[f]ed. Scores of knapsacks covering the surface of the water were all that was visible of the unfortunate men as they floated, thus burdened, in the river. Captain Christian Wyck, of company K, Lieutenant Adolf Winter, of company I, First Sergeant Joseph Tiedemann, of company K, and fifty enlisted men were drowned. Sergeant Tiedemann, an expert swimmer, sacrificed his life in a vain attempt to save that of his Captain.

Those troops remaining on the east side of the river eventually crossed at Snicker's Ferry. The regiment reached Winchester, Virginia, on April 18, where the men received new uniforms, shoes, tents, and rations. Colonel Bohlen received his commission as brigade commander and command of the regiment fell to Lieutenant-Colonel Mahler.

Beginning on May 6, the men of the 75th Pennsylvania marched west from Winchester, passing through Romney and Petersburg, West Virginia, before arriving in Franklin, West Virginia. At Franklin, the men endured a period of near starvation. On May 26, the regiment arrived back in Petersburg, where the men were provided with rations that again proved insufficient. After leaving Petersburg, the troops endured a grueling march, during which they passed through Moorefield, before they eventually emerged into the Shenandoah Valley. In pursuit of rapidly retreating Confederate troops, they marched south through the valley passing through Strasburg, Woodstock, Mount Jackson and New Market, Virginia.

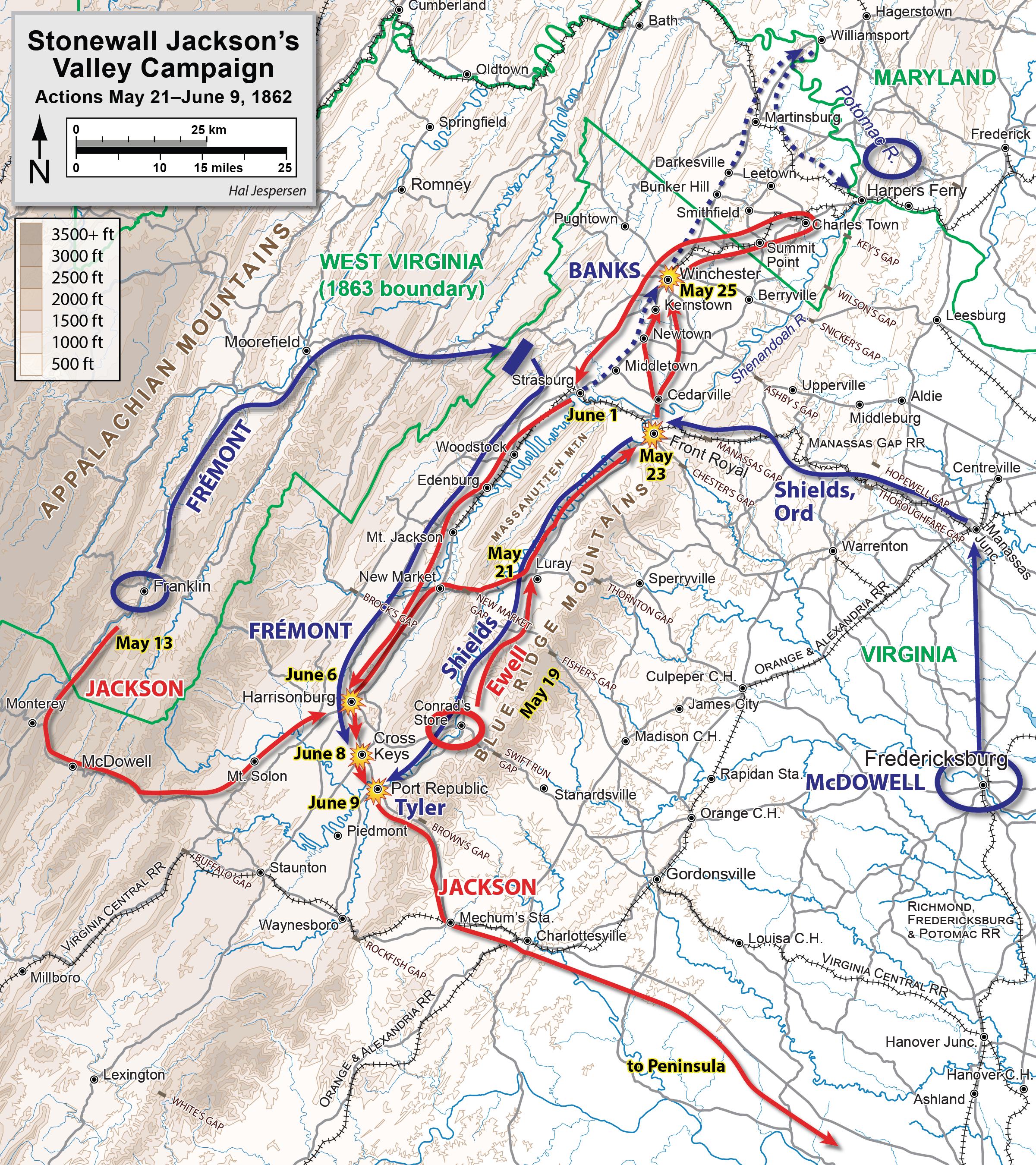
Jackson's Valley Campaign, showing the route taken by the 75th Pennsylvania, while under the command of General Frémont, from Franklin, West Virginia, to the Battle of Cross Keys. Confederate Union

Battle of Cross Keys

On June 8, the 75th Pennsylvania participated in the Battle of Cross Keys near Harrisonburg, Virginia. The regiment arrived in an open area to the left of the Cross Keys Road, just past Pirkey's farm, at a little after 2:00 p.m. The men formed into double columns, but were held in reserve. The 75th Pennsylvania advanced to relieve other units on the left flank, sustaining heavy losses. However, as the regiment started to deploy, it was ordered to retreat into a gully to give the artillery a clear lane of fire. Thereafter, the regiment executed an orderly withdrawal. The next morning, federal troops found that the Confederates had abandoned their positions during the night. The Battle of Cross Keys was considered a Confederate victory.

On June 26, the 75th Pennsylvania was placed within the Second Brigade of the Third Division of the newly formed First Corps under the command of Major-General Sigel. On June 30, upon assuming command of the First Corps, Sigel dispatched a communication to Major General Pope from Middletown, Virginia, which read in part: "The troops forming the First Corps are not in good condition; they are weakened and poorly provided." In early July, the troops marched south, passing down the Luray Valley before arriving at Luray. From Luray, the regiment proceeded east and, after passing through Thornton's Gap, it arrived at Sperryville, Virginia. The regiment remained in this location for several weeks.

Skirmish at Freeman's Ford

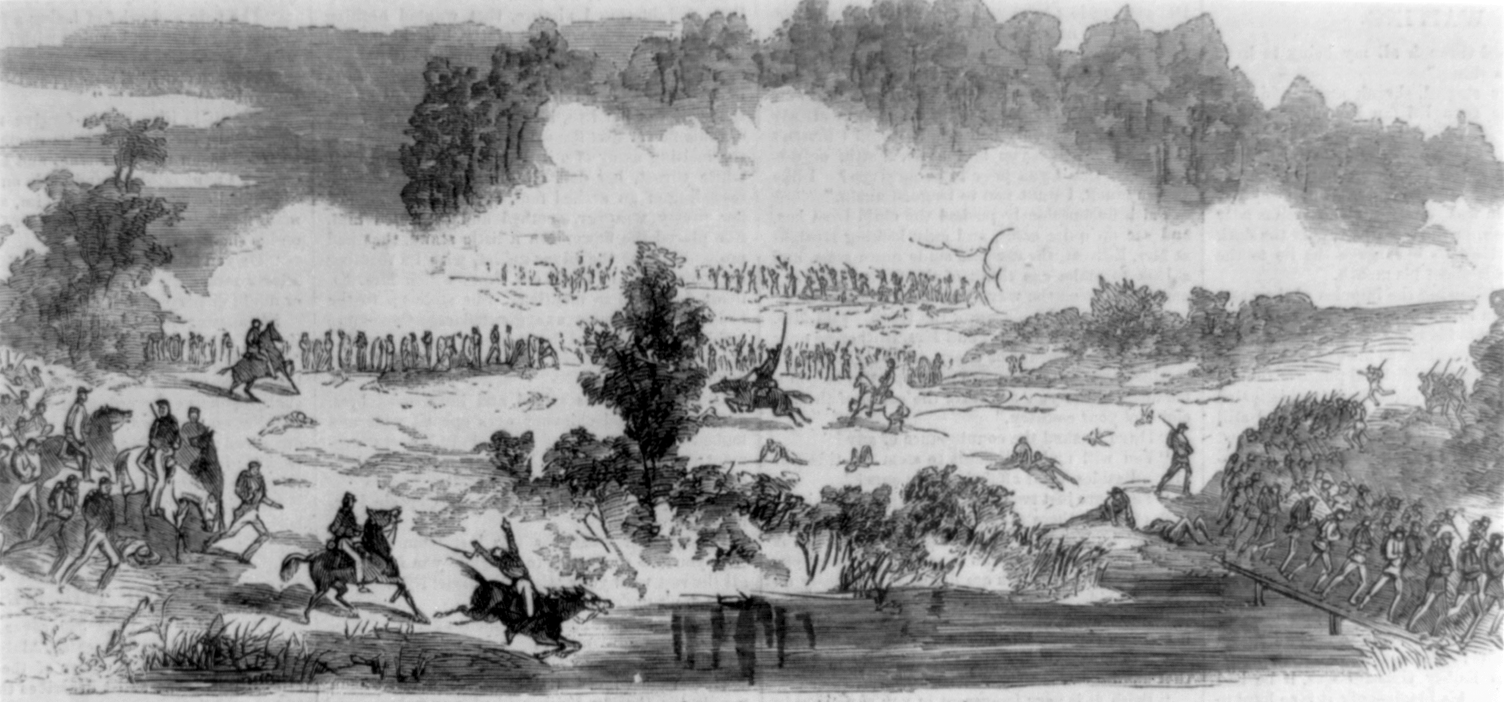
The Battle of Rappahannock Station (Freeman's Ford), by Davenport, showing the death of Brigadier General Bohlen.

On August 20, the 75th Pennsylvania crossed the Rappahannock River at Warrenton Sulphur Springs. The men then marched downstream along the north bank until they reached a point near Rappahannock Station. Also, on that date, a series of promotions altered the command structure of the regiment. Lieutenant-colonel Mahler was promoted to colonel, Major Alwin Von Matzdorf was promoted to lieutenant-colonel, and Captain August Ledig was promoted to major.

On the morning of August 22, the 75th Pennsylvania moved upstream to Freeman's Ford. The regiment waded across the Rappahannock and mounted the steep bank on the far side. General Sigel had ordered the troops to reconnoiter the area to the left of the ford. After moving inland a short distance, they encountered Confederates in heavy force and fell back toward the river. During the skirmish at Freeman's Ford, which is considered part of the First Battle of Rappahannock Station, Brigadier General Bohlen, the original commander of the 75th Pennsylvania, was killed by enemy fire.

Second Manassas

On August 28, the 75th Pennsylvania was first ordered to march toward Manassas, but was then redirected toward Centreville. On August 29, the regiment was thrown forward against the forces of Confederate Generals Ewell and Jackson about a mile east of Groveton. The men crossed the turnpike then forded Young's Branch. The troops moved north toward an unfinished railroad embankment. Skirmishers soon encountered a strong force of the enemy. The Confederates advanced in mass and a general battle erupted. The 75th Pennsylvania furiously engaged the enemy until the Fifty-eighth New York Volunteer Regiment could be brought forward. At great cost, the men succeeded in driving the enemy back and gained possession of the railroad embankment. General Carl Schurz, in his report on the engagement, observed, "The conduct of the Seventy-fifth Pennsylvania, which displayed the greatest firmness and preserved perfect order on that occasion, deploying and firing with the utmost regularity, deserve[s] special praise."

At just after 3:00 p.m. on August 30, the 75th Pennsylvania was positioned near Dogan's farm house, facing toward Groveton. There it received a heaving shelling from an enemy battery. The men were ordered forward and managed to seize the crest of a wooded hill. At that point, a fierce firefight erupted. Colonel Mahler, who was in command of the regiment, was wounded. When a Confederate battery opened, the men were forced to seek cover in a ravine about 100 yards behind the position they had previously occupied. A general retreat was ordered. Just after 2:00 a.m., the men waded across Bull Run and, by 7:00 a.m. they arrived in Centreville. During the Second Battle of Manassas, another defeat for the Union Army, the 75th Pennsylvania suffered 133 casualties. The regiment spent the winter of 1862–1863 in the defenses of the capital, moving between Centreville, Stafford Courthouse, and Brook's Station.

=== 1863 ===
Chancellorsville

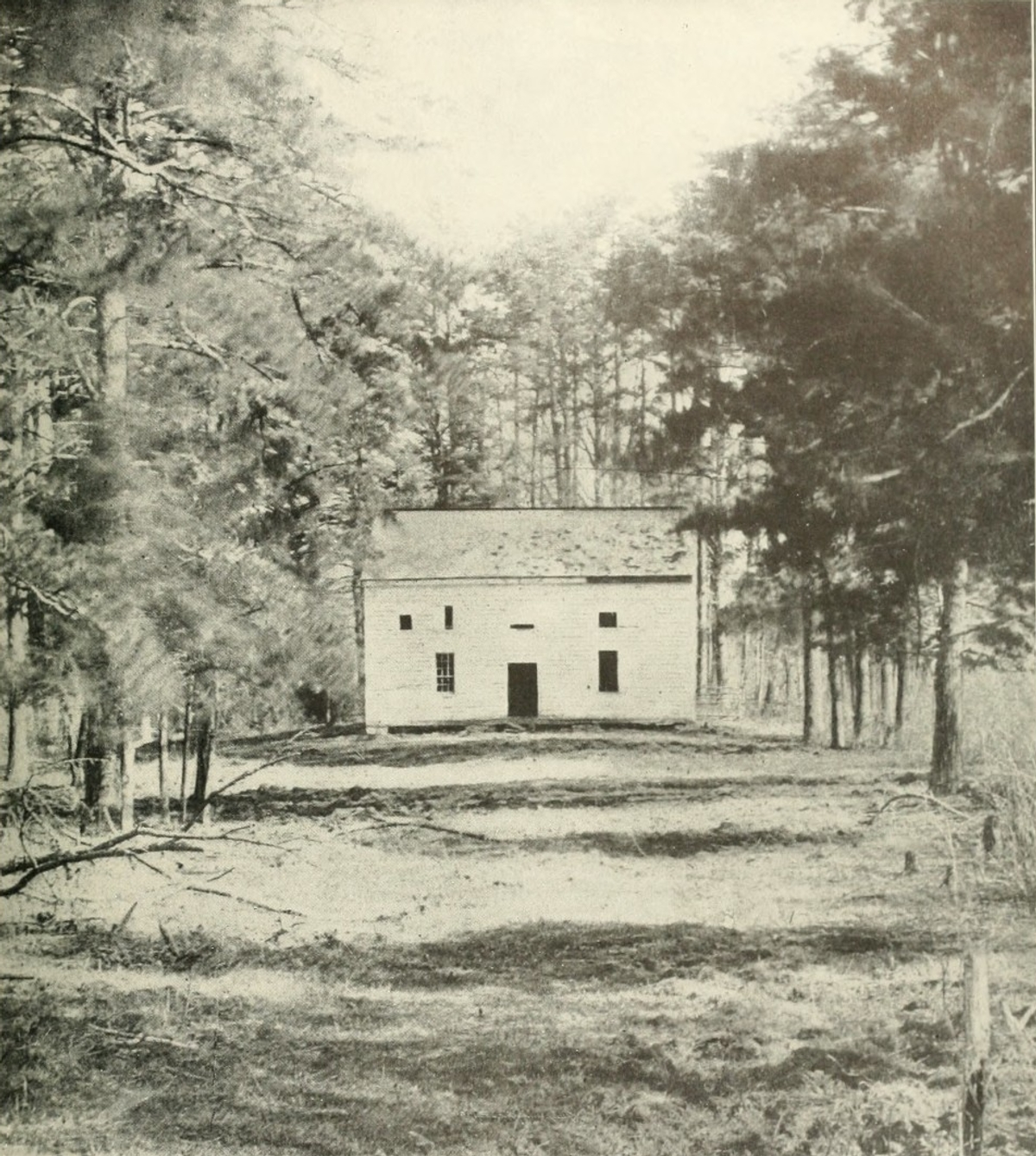
After the 75th Pennsylvania was routed along with the remainder of the Eleventh Corps in General Stonewall Jackson's flank attack, scattered elements of the regiment made a brief stand near the Wilderness Church at Chancellorsville.

In January, 1863, the 75th Pennsylvania participated in General Burnside's failed second advance, the infamous "Mud March.". It then moved to Hartwood Church, near Falmouth, before returning to Stafford Courthouse. On, April 27, the regiment marched from camp near Brook's Station, proceeding northwest. The men crossed the Rappahannock River by pontoon bridge at Kelley's Ford, and proceeded south, crossing the Rapidan River on a makeshift bridge at Germanna Ford. After passing the Wilderness Tavern, on April 30, the regiment arrived at a location about two miles west of Chancellorsville, in an area known as "the Wilderness." The men were positioned in a clearing astride the Chancellorsville Turnpike in the spot where it joined the Orange Court House Plank Road. The clearing contained a farmhouse, the Hawkins' farm, the Wilderness Church, and an inn known as Dowdall's Tavern.

On May 2 Union commanders received reports of a large body of Confederate troops marching rapidly to the west. Major General Howard, in charge of the Eleventh Corps, of which the 75th Pennsylvania was part, ignored this potential threat. Just before 6:00 p.m., Confederate General Jackson attacked the Union flank with 28,000 troops. Several elements of the 75th Pennsylvania were overtaken. Due to the confusion and the thickness of the undergrowth surrounding the area, several groups of men became separated from the main force. The men retreated in disorder as one unit collapsed back upon the next unit further to the east. Casualties were high. Altogether, the Confederates captured 40 men from the regiment, including Lieutenant-Colonel Alwin Matzdorff. The 75th Pennsylvania did not see any serious action for the remainder of the battle, which was a resounding Confederate victory. On May 5, General Hooker ordered a general retreat, and the regiment returned to its camp near Brook's Station. The German-speaking troops were made the scapegoats for the Union defeat at Chancellorsville. Morale within the regiment hit an all-time low.

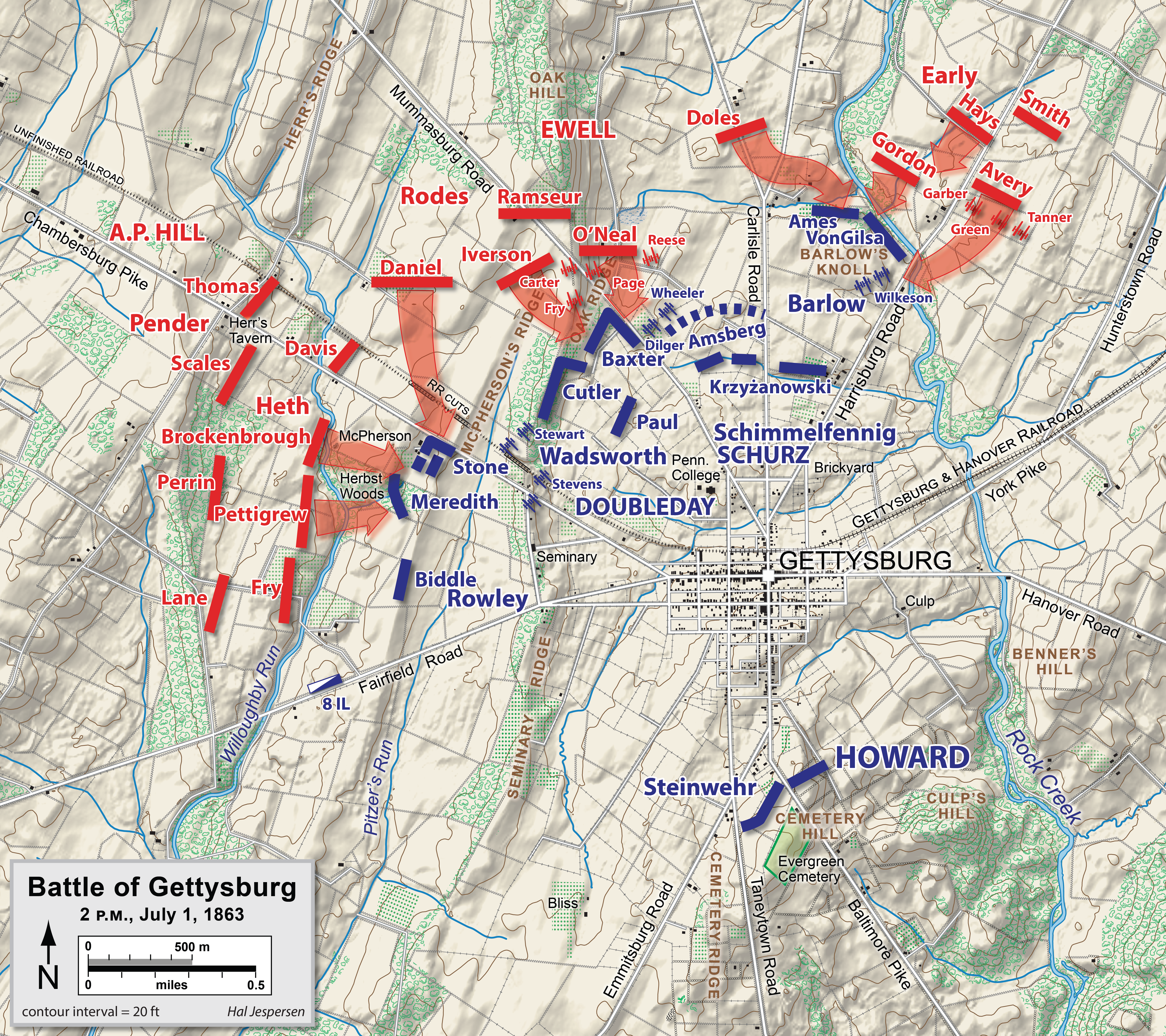
Confederate forces attack the Eleventh Corps, 2:00–4:00 p.m. on July 1, 1863. The 75th Pennsylvania, under Schurz and Krzyzanowski, was positioned just east of the Carlisle Road and west of Barlow Knoll

Gettysburg

On June 12, 1863, the 75th Pennsylvania embarked on an exhaustive series of marches, in response to a threatened Confederate invasion of Maryland and Pennsylvania. On June 25, the regiment crossed the Potomac River at Edward's Ferry, and proceeded northwest into Maryland. By June 30, the men had reached Emmitsburg, Maryland, where they camped on the grounds of the St. Joseph's Seminary. On the morning of July 1, the regiment was rushed toward Gettysburg, Pennsylvania, along the Taneytown Road. After passing through town, the regiment advanced northward across open fields under enemy fire. At about 2:00 p.m. the men were arrayed in a line of battle just east of the Carlisle Road. There, an intense firefight occurred. The 75th Pennsylvania held this position for nearly an hour. However, a Confederate flanking maneuver and the collapse of adjacent regiments exposed the men to an enfilading fire that cut large gaps in the ranks.

Colonel Mahler, the regiment's commander, was hit in the leg at the same moment that his horse was shot out from under him. Mahler was able to drag himself from under the stricken animal and stayed in the fight. However, he was soon struck by a second shot and lay mortally wounded. Mahler would die in a field hospital on July 5. Captain Saalmann of Company C was also severely wounded at this time. Lieutenant Sill was shot through the leg, which was later amputated. He died in a field hospital several weeks later. In the midst of these mounting casualties, Major August Ledig took command. A general retreat was ordered. The 75th Pennsylvania fell back through town, rallying at Cemetery Hill. Over the next two days, the regiment was positioned in the defenses of Cemetery Hill on the far right of the Union Army. From this position, it continued to exchange fire with the enemy.

During the Battle of Gettysburg, the 75th Pennsylvania lost many men and officers, with 31 killed, nearly 100 wounded, and six taken prisoner. These losses amounted to 72 percent of those who participated in the battle. Only one other regiment at Gettysburg, the 1st Minnesota, which recorded losses of 82 percent, sustained higher casualties. The overwhelming bulk of the casualties occurred within a relatively short period, perhaps 20 minutes, on the afternoon of July 1. Lieutenant Steiger spoke of the losses as follows:

While there were many regiments who suffered terrible and naturally sustained great loss in this action, yet we claim that the magnitude of its loss, here sustained, as made manifest in its shrunken ranks, was painfully evident to all as the regiment proceeded on the march from Gettysburg to follow the retreating troops of the Confederate army, when its largely depleted ranks presented an object lesson of grim significance. For such was the decimation in its ranks that the little band of men, numbering but fifty-two survivors, evoked the tender sympathy of troops of the emergency corps, whom we passed drawn up in line as we went through the village of Middletown while on the march in pursuit of General Robert E. Lee's retreating army ... These troops viewed with amazement the passing column of battle scarred men ... which in themselves practically constituted the remnant of this regiment as it emerged from the battlefield of Gettysburg."

Transfer to Tennessee

During late summer 1863, much of the Union Army lay besieged in Chattanooga, Tennessee. To alleviate this situation, about 18,000 troops from the Army of the Potomac were transported to the Chattanooga area by train. The 75th Pennsylvania was among those units transferred. On September 24, the regiment received marching orders and immediately broke camp at Warrenton, Virginia. The troops marched east through the night, arriving at Warrenton Junction the following morning. They then turned north along the tracks of the Orange and Alexandria Railroad reaching Manassas at 5:00 p.m. on the afternoon of the 25th. There, the men were herded aboard railroad cars. In a complex movement that entailed several changes of trains and engines, the troops passed through Washington, D.C., Harper's Ferry, Maryland, Grafton, West Virginia, and Columbus, Ohio, before arriving in Indianapolis, Indiana. From there, they travelled south, passing through Louisville, Kentucky, and Nashville, Tennessee, before arriving in Bridgeport, Alabama, on October 2, 1863.

Operations around Chattanooga

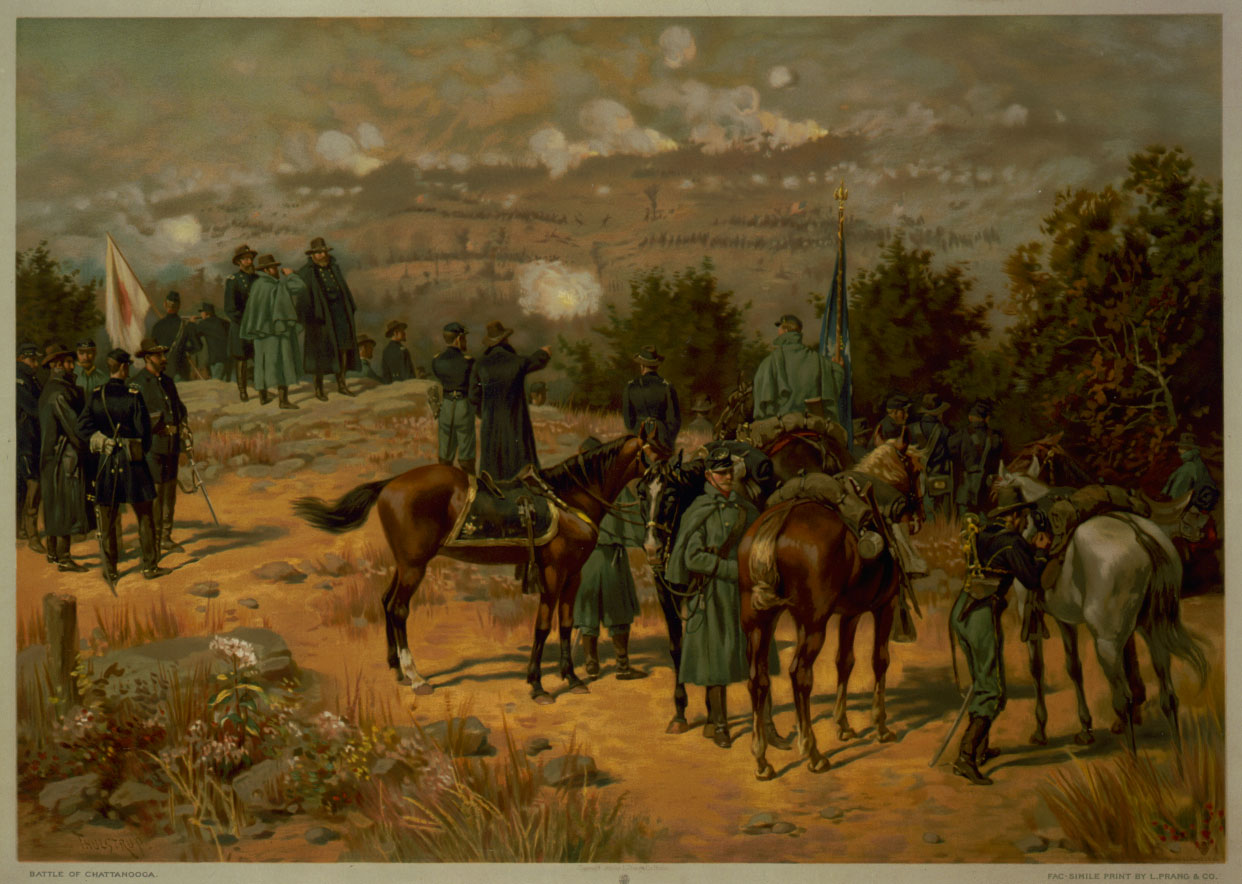
The Battle of Chattanooga and assault on Missionary Ridge.

On October 19, 1863, the 75th Pennsylvania was assigned to the Third Brigade of the Third Division of the Eleventh Corps, under Colonel Hecker. In the early morning hours of October 29, the regiment engaged in a rare night battle near Wauhatchie, Tennessee. It did not sustain any serious losses during this Union victory. Between November 23 and November 26, the regiment played a role in the Battle of Chattanooga. According to Lieutenant Steiger, the regiment "participated in all the movements and fighting of the division around Chattanooga, culminating on the 25th in carrying Missionary Ridge and establishing the complete rout of the enemy."

On November 28, the regiment, as part of the Eleventh Corps, was ordered to proceed to the relief of General Burnside, who was under siege at Knoxville, Tennessee. After a difficult winter march, which took the troops eastward through Cleveland, Sweetwater, Philadelphia, Loudon, and Unitia, they arrived in Louisville, Tennessee, on December 5. There they learned that the siege had been lifted. They were ordered to return to the vicinity of Chattanooga.

=== 1864 and 1865 ===
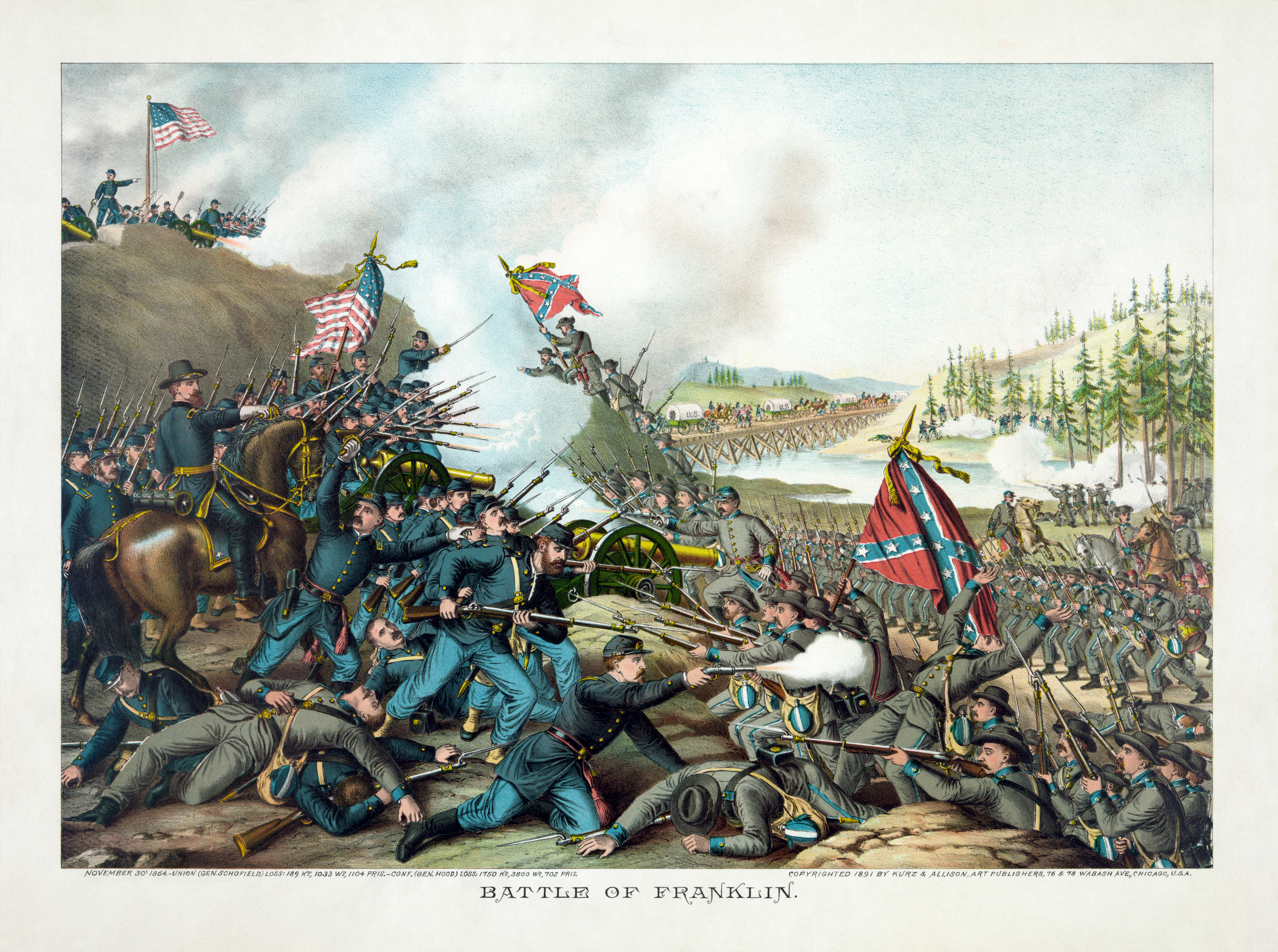
The Battle of Franklin was a Union victory that exacted a high toll in Confederate lives.

On January 2, 1864, the 75th Pennsylvania was remustered into the army as a veteran organization. The troops received a 30-day furlough, which enabled them to visit their families in Philadelphia. The furlough ended on March 8, when the troops left Philadelphia by train, the ranks having been swelled by new recruits. The men of the regiment eventually arrived at Bridgeport, Alabama, and resumed duties similar to those performed before their departure. The regiment participated in the Battle of Franklin, Tennessee, on November 30. Of this engagement, Lieutenant Steiger reported:

At the battle of Franklin, Tennessee ... where the Southern Army, under the command of General Hood, received a disastrous check in its advance upon Nashville, a mounted detachment of the Seventy-fifth Regiment occupied the town, and companies A, C, F, G, H, I and K ... were encamped at Fort Granger, on the north bank of the Harpeth. The several detachments ... were under fire but ... suffered only a small loss. Company E, however, under the command of Lieutenant Wiegand, which had for some time been stationed at a point several miles south of the town on the Tennessee and Alabama Railroad, was captured by the advancing rebel army ...This unfortunate episode entailed a loss of one commissioned officer and about thirty enlisted men, who, after several months' confinement as prisoners of war, were released on parole and sent to their homes.

During the remainder of its service, the regiment played a supporting role, guarded and transported prisoners, guarded the railroad, and engaged in provost duty in the vicinity of Franklin and Nashville, Tennessee. The 75th Pennsylvania was mustered out of service on September 1, 1865. On September 9 the regiment departed Murfreesboro, Tennessee, and arrived back in Pennsylvania on September 12.

== Casualties ==
- Killed and mortally wounded: 6 officers and 46 enlisted men
- Died of disease or other factors: 2 officers and 107 enlisted men
- Total Mortality: 161 men

== Monuments and memorials ==
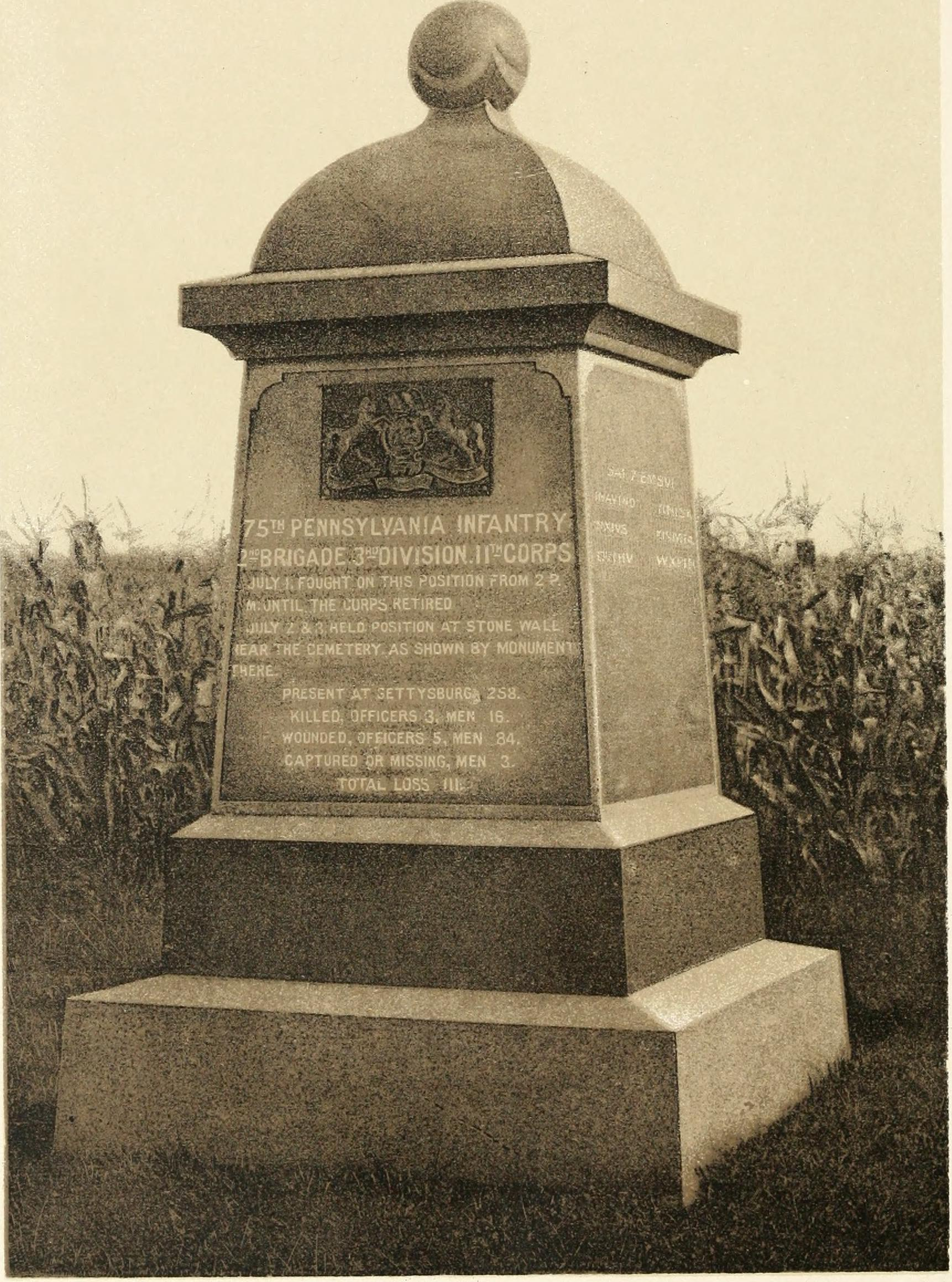
75th Pennsylvania Infantry Regiment memorial, Gettysburg

On the battlefield at Gettysburg, Pennsylvania, two monuments commemorate the role of the 75th Pennsylvania. The first, dedicated in 1876, is located in the national cemetery southeast of town. The front panel reads "In Memoriam of Our Comrades." The second monument, completed in 1888, is north of town on Howard Road, just east of Carlisle Road. This monument marks the position held by the 75th Pennsylvania on the afternoon of July 1, 1863, before it was overrun by Confederate forces. The front panel reads: "75th Pennsylvania Infantry 2nd Brigade, 3rd Division, 11th Corps. July 1. Fought on this position from 2 p.m. until the Corps retired. July 2 & 3. Held position at stone wall near the Cemetery as shown by monument there. Present at Gettysburg 258; Killed, officers 3, men 16; Wounded, officers 5, men 89; Captured or missing, men 3; Total loss 111." The Pennsylvania State Memorial at Gettysburg has plaque along its base listing the participants and the order of command within the regiment at Gettysburg.

A monument to the 75th Pennsylvania also exists on Orchard Knob at Chattanooga, Tennessee, marking the participation of the 75th Pennsylvania in clearing Confederate resistance from around that city. It is located on lands that comprise the Chickamauga & Chattanooga National Military Park.

== See also ==
- List of Pennsylvania Civil War Units
- Pennsylvania in the Civil War
