= Staunton National Cemetery =

Historic veterans cemetery in Staunton, Virginia

- U.S. National Register of Historic Places
- Virginia Landmarks Register
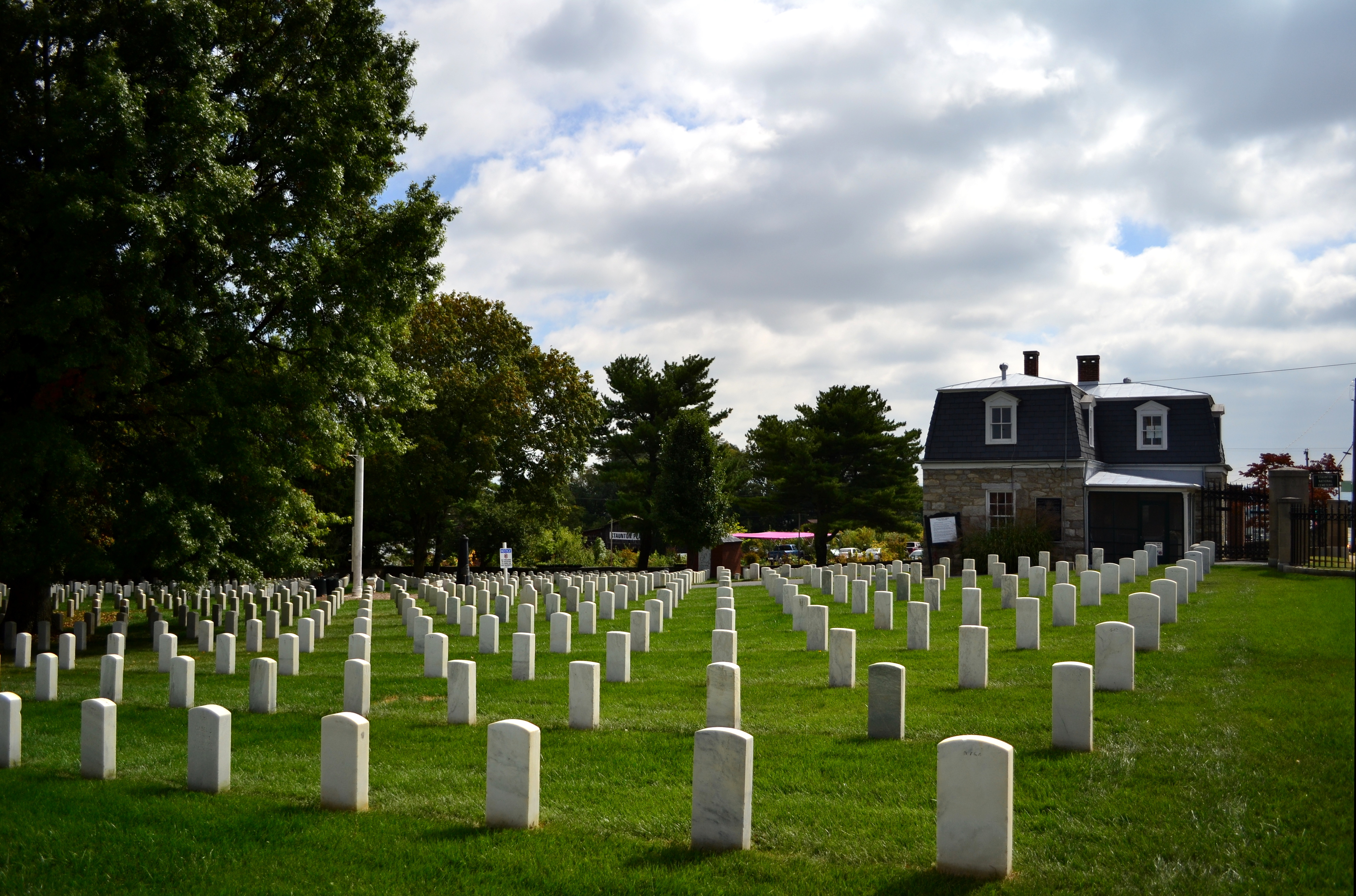

- Location within Virginia Location within the United States
- Location: 901 Richmond Ave., Staunton, Virginia
- Coordinates: 38°08′25″N 79°02′58″W
- Area: 1.2 acres (0.49 ha)
- Architect: Meigs, Montgomery C.
- Architectural style: Second Empire
- MPS: Civil War Era National Cemeteries MPS
- NRHP reference No.: 96000034
- VLR No.: 132-0019

Significant dates
- Added to NRHP: February 26, 1996
- Designated VLR: October 18, 1995

Staunton National Cemetery is a United States National Cemetery located in the Shenandoah Valley, in Staunton, Virginia. Administered by the United States Department of Veterans Affairs, it encompasses just over a single acre, and as of the end of 2005 had 994 interments. It is closed to new interments, and is maintained by the Culpeper National Cemetery.

== History ==
Designated a National Cemetery in September 1868, the original interments comprised the remains of Union soldiers removed from Staunton's Thornrose Cemetery, several local battlefields, and nearby towns and counties. Many were soldiers who died during the American Civil War at the Battle of Cross Keys, Battle of Port Republic, and the Battle of Piedmont. More than 500 of these soldiers were reinterred as unknowns.

Staunton National Cemetery was listed on the National Register of Historic Places in 1996.

== Notable interments ==
- Captain Nicolae Dunca (1837–1862), a Union officer on the staff of Gen. John C. Fremont and a Romanian by birth, who was killed while carrying a dispatch during the Battle of Cross Keys.
