= Dunca =

Dunca is a surname. Notable people with the surname include:

- Rodica Dunca (born 1965), Romanian artistic gymnast
- Nicolae Dunca (1837–1862), officer of the Union Army
