= George Pomutz =

Hungarian-born Romanian-American officer

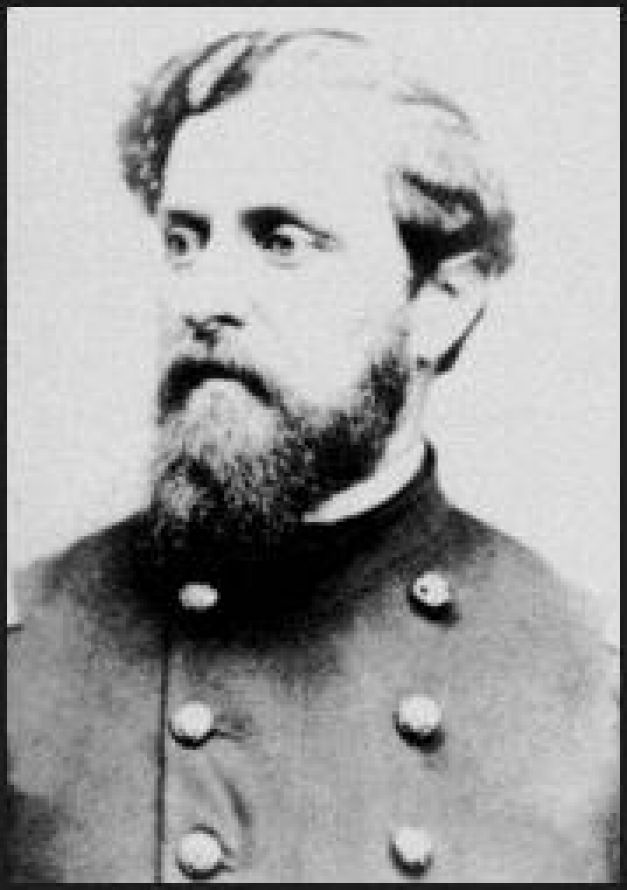
- George Pomutz
- Born: May 31, 1818; Gyula, Kingdom of Hungary, Austrian Empire
- Died: October 12, 1882 (aged 64); Saint Petersburg, Russian Empire
- Burial place: Smolensky Cemetery, Saint Petersburg, Russia
- Military career
- Allegiance: Kingdom of Hungary; United States of America: Union
- Branch: Honved Army; Union Army
- Service years: 1861–1865 (US)
- Rank: Captain (Hungary); Lieutenant Colonel; Bvt. Brigadier General
- Unit: 15th Iowa Infantry Regiment
- Commands: (Provisional) Iowa Battalion; Provost Marshal, XVII Corps
- Conflicts: Hungarian Revolution of 1848; American Civil War: Battle of Shiloh; Siege of Corinth; Vicksburg Campaign; Battle of Atlanta
- Other work: U.S. Consul

George Pomutz (in Romanian: Gheorghe Pomuț, in Hungarian: Pomucz György or Pomutz György; May 31, 1818 – October 12, 1882) was a Romanian-American officer during the Hungarian Revolution of 1848 against the Habsburgs, a general in the Union Army in the American Civil War, a lawyer, and a diplomat.

== Early life ==
George Pomutz was born in the Kingdom of Hungary, Austrian Empire, in the town of Gyula (Romanian: Giula), Békés county, to ethnic Romanian orthodox parents Ioan and Victoria, the family originally from Săcele (Négyfalu, Siebendörfer), near Brașov (Brassó, Kronstadt) in Transylvania, settling in Gyula during the second half of the 18th century.

His baptism record was registered under no. 63 at the Romanian orthodox church Sfântul Nicolae, located in Miklosvaros (Nagy román város / Big Romanian town), situated in the NE part of Gyula; it also notes that a copy of this document was solicited and obtained from the church on June 27, 1857.

His paternal grandfather Dica worked as a blacksmith for the local landlord Wenckheim; according to the free online searchable Family Search genealogy website (Romanian Orthodox Church death records for Gyula) he died at Gyula on April 22, 1803.

George received his primary and secondary education in Hungary, followed by the Military Academy in Vienna and Military Academy Saint Etienne (France). He spoke about 5-6 languages and later specialized in France where he became a royal prosecutor. He served as a captain in the failed Hungarian Revolution of 1848. Afterwards, in 1849, he emigrated to the United States; arriving in New York on February 24, 1850, alongside 20 acquaintances. The group of immigrants, Romanians and Hungarians, settled around the town of Keokuk, Iowa, founding a settlement named New Buda located south of the town of Burlington. George Pomutz became a U.S. citizen on March 15, 1855. He purchased land and a mining concession, the 1860 U.S. Census finding him living in Decatur, Iowa.

== Civil War ==
At the beginning of the Civil War, Pomutz enrolled in the Union Army as a first lieutenant in the 15th Iowa Infantry Regiment. He was wounded at the Battle of Shiloh. In May 1864, after Pomutz had commanded the provisional Iowa Battalion, Maj. Gen. Francis P. Blair appointed Pomutz as Provost Marshal of his XVII Corps. In August 1864, Pomutz returned to the 15th Iowa Infantry, which he commanded in the Battle of Atlanta.

On May 4, 1866, President Andrew Johnson nominated Pomutz for appointment to the grade of brevet brigadier general of volunteers, to rank from March 13, 1865, and the United States Senate confirmed the appointment on May 18, 1866.

== Postbellum career ==
After the end of the Civil War, Pomutz returned to Keokuk. On February 16, 1866, he was appointed Consul of the United States in Saint Petersburg, Imperial Russia, serving in that capacity until September 30, 1870. During that period, he was involved in the negotiations for the Alaska Purchase. Later he became the American consul general in Saint Petersburg, serving from June 17, 1874, until his death there, in 1882. He was buried in Smolensky Cemetery, Saint Petersburg, Russia but his grave seems to have disappeared, possibly after the re-purposing of cemetery lands by the Bolsheviks, after the 1917 Russian Revolution.

== Legacy ==
The Liberty ship SS George Pomutz was named after him. Launched August 3, 1944, the ship served till 1970.

On August 14, 2004, a statue of Pomutz was unveiled at the Dormition of the Theotokos Cathedral in Cleveland, Ohio.

A street in Timișoara, Romania bears his name.

== Quotation ==
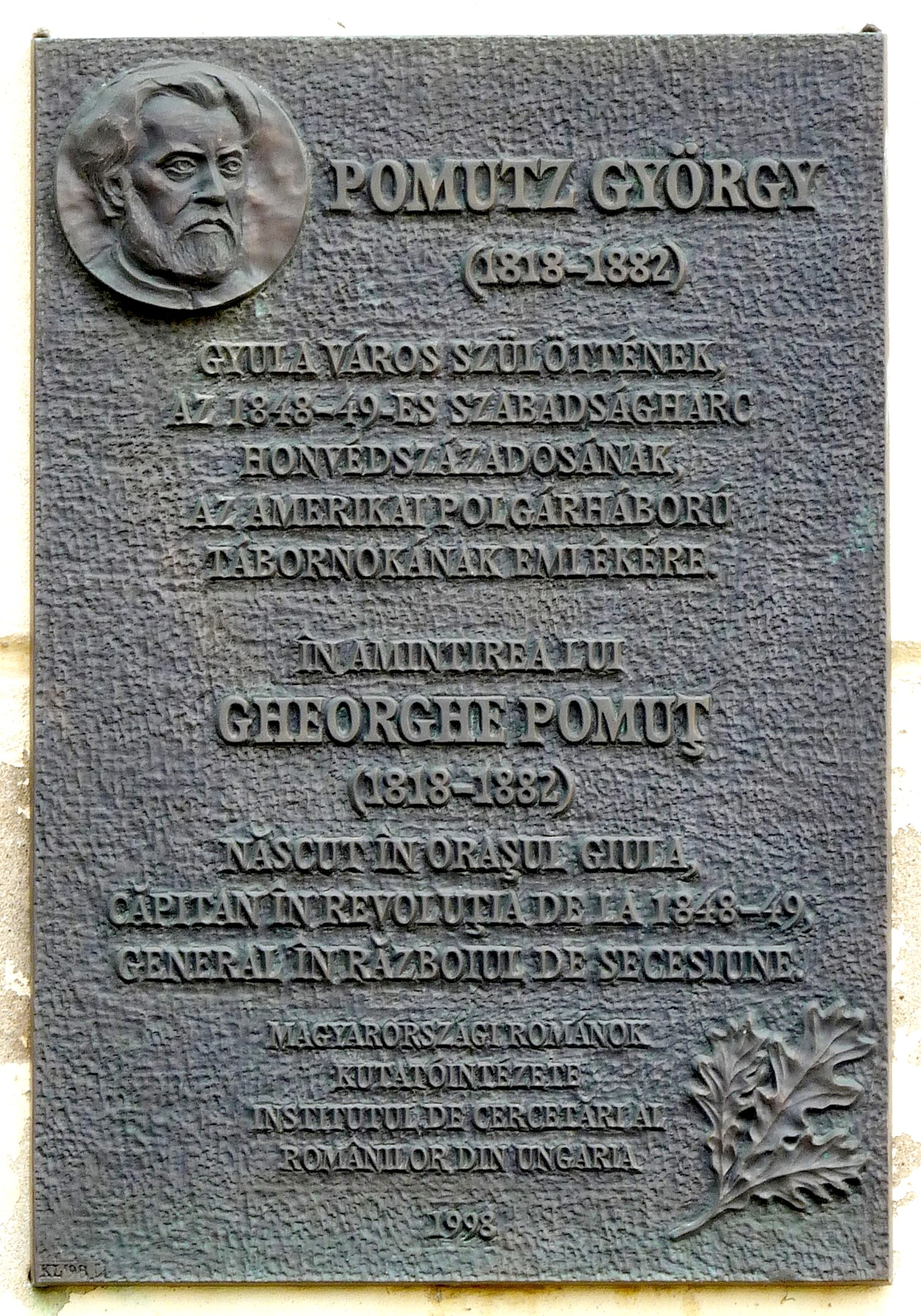
Memorial tablet of Pomutz in Gyula, Hungary

From the address by Emil Constantinescu, President of Romania, at a Joint Meeting of the United States Congress, July 15, 1998:

I would like to close with a true story. One hundred and fifty years ago, a young Romanian who had fought for freedom in the 1848 revolution, emigrated to America. His name was George Pomutz, which in Romanian means "little tree." Once on American soil, he volunteered for Lincoln's Army and fought in some of the key battles of the Civil War including Vicksburg and Atlanta. Our "little tree" went on to become a general in your army and later an American diplomat, serving in Russia where he helped negotiate the American purchase of Alaska. In 1944, long after his death, the Romanian community in the United States donated money to build a battleship, named for Romanian-American General George Pomutz. The ship named for the "little tree" served in peace and war, always a symbol of strength and vigilance.

== See also ==
- Nicolae Dunca
- List of American Civil War brevet generals (Union)
