= Hülscheid =

- Village of Schalksmühle
- Interactive map of Hülscheid
- Location within Germany Location within North Rhine-Westphalia
- Coordinates: 51°15′N 07°34′E
- Country: Germany
- State: North Rhine-Westphalia
- District: Märkischer Kreis
- Town: Schalksmühle
- Elevation: 350 m (1,150 ft)
- Time zone: UTC+01:00 (CET)
  - Summer (DST): UTC+02:00 (CEST)
- Postal codes: 58579
- Dialling codes: 02355
- Vehicle registration: MK

Hülscheid is a village in district Märkischer Kreis, in North Rhine-Westphalia, Germany. In 1969 it was suburbanised to Schalksmühle.

== Geography ==
Hülscheid is located to the east-northeast of Schalksmühle, to the northwest of Lüdenscheid and to the south of Hagen. It is in the Sauerland.

== History ==
The oldest written documents on the municipality date back to 1350, when the farmers of Hülscheid formed a free dukedom. The largest extent of the Freigrafschaft Hülscheid was in 1478, when it contained not only the Kirchspiel Hülscheid, but also the northwestern part of the Kirchspiel Lüdenscheid.

== Coat of arms ==
The coat of arms shows three leaves of European Holly (Ilex aquifolium), a red-and-white chequered pattern in the middle and a small golden field at the bottom. This was designed by Otto Hupp based on an idea of Fritz Thomée, former Landrat of the district Altena and was granted on January 16, 1935. It is however not in official use any more as Hülscheid is now politically a part of Schalksmühle and the Hülscheid coat of arms has been integrated into the Schalksmühle coat of arms.

== Church ==
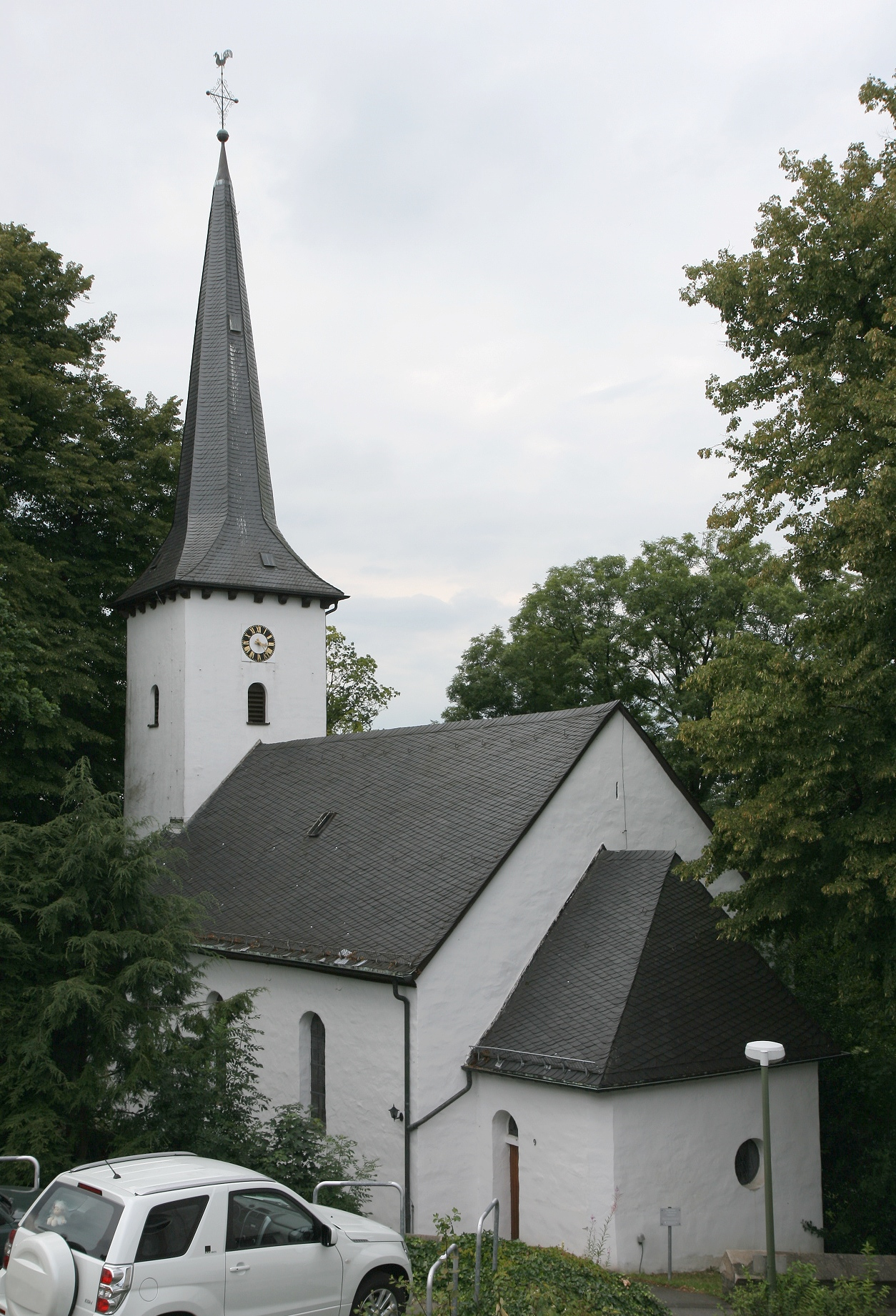
The Church

There is a one-nave hall type church in Hülscheid with a small drawn-in quadratic choir and a quadratic tower. An inscription on the south is dated 1784 and says : "Auxiliante do ecclesia heacce ex fundo renovata ete perfecta / est sub cura th. h. Pöpinghaus Hülsche densium / reformator um fidelis abe architectis corn. hend. et caps. wilh. iac. ulenberg fratribus" To the south of the tower one can find two baroque gravestones. The church has two medium-sized bells dated 1482 and 1487 as well as one small bell which was cast in the 2nd half of the 12th century.

== Clubs and Societies ==
- Voluntary Fire Department
- Shooting Club
- Riders Association
