= Nicolae Dunca =

Union Army officer

- Nicolae Dunca
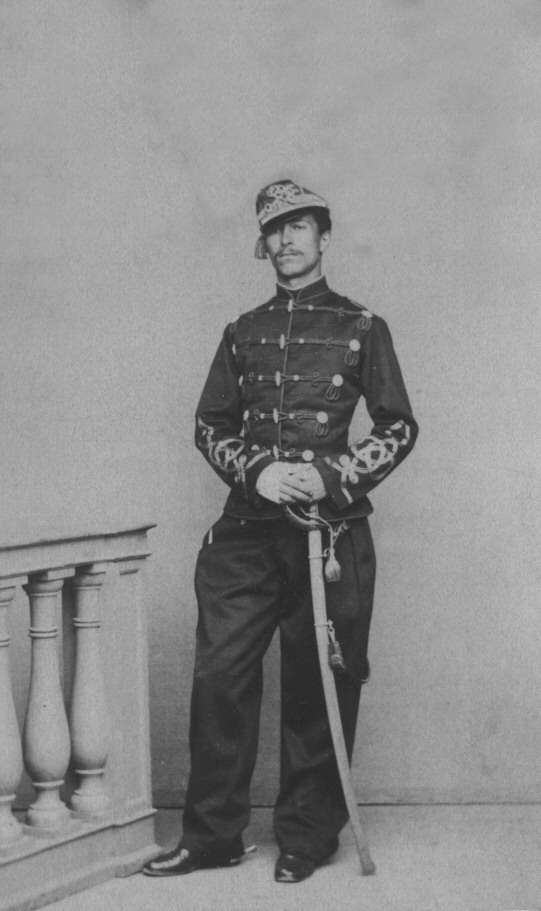
- Nicolae Dunca during the American Civil War
- Born: 1837; Iași, Moldavia
- Died: June 8, 1862; Rockingham County, Virginia
- Burial place: Staunton National Cemetery
- Military career
- Allegiance: Kingdom of Hungary; United States of America
- Branch: Honved Army; Union Army
- Service years: 1862 (USA)
- Rank: Captain
- Unit: 12th New York Infantry Regiment
- Conflicts: Hungarian Revolution of 1848; Wars of Italian Unification: Expedition of the Thousand; American Civil War: Battle of Cross Keys †

Nicolae Dunca (1837 – June 8, 1862) was a Romanian military officer who served in several conflicts in Europe and in the American Civil War.

== Life and career ==
Dunca was born in 1837 in Iași, Moldavia. He served in the Honved Army during the Hungarian Revolution of 1848 and later was a lieutenant under Figyelmessy on Sicily. Dunca came to the United States and enlisted in the Union Army in March 1862 and, due to his past military experience, was appointed captain in the 8th New York Infantry Regiment. He was later assigned as aide-de-camp to Major General John C. Fremont, whose army was operating in the Shenandoah Valley. Dunca was shot and killed by a Georgian (Pvt. John Long of Co. B, 21st Georgia Infantry) on picket duty at the Battle of Cross Keys on June 8, 1862. When the picket searched Dunca's personal effects, it was discovered that he was carrying a dispatch outlining Gen. Fremont's order of march for the day. He was buried at Perkey’s Farm, Cross Keys, Virginia, and his remains were later transferred to the Staunton National Cemetery (Section B, Grave 292).

Dunca was not the only non-Hungarian to serve in the Union army. There were several officers in the Union Army who, although not natives of Hungary, may be classified as Hungarians, for they had been identified with the Hungarians' cause, spoke the Hungarian language and attached themselves in America to the Hungarians. Among them were Constantin Blandovski, a Pole who had served in the Honvéd Army and few others.

== See also ==
- George Pomutz
