= Henry Bohlen =

German-American army officer (1810-1862)

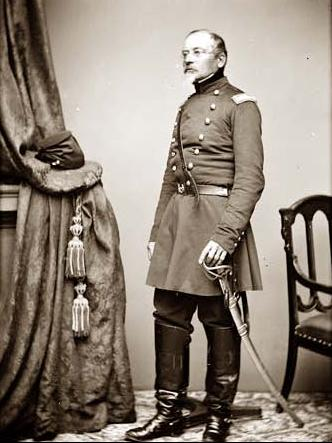
- Brig. Gen. Henry Bohlen
- Born: October 22, 1810; Bremen, French Empire
- Died: August 22, 1862 (aged 51); Rappahannock River, Virginia, Confederate States of America
- Burial place: Laurel Hill Cemetery, Philadelphia, Pennsylvania, U.S.
- Military career
- Allegiance: United States of America; Second French Empire
- Branch: United States Army; French Army; Union Army
- Service years: 1846 - 1848; 1861 - 1862 (USA); 1853 - 1856 (France)
- Rank: Brigadier General
- Conflicts: Mexican-American War; Crimean War; Siege of Sevastopol; American Civil War; Shenandoah Valley Campaign; Northern Virginia Campaign †

Henry Bohlen (October 22, 1810 – August 22, 1862) was a German-American Union Brigadier General of the American Civil War. Before becoming the first foreign-born Union general in the Civil War, he fought in the Mexican-American War (on the U.S. side), and in the Crimean War (on the French side).

== Biography ==
Bohlen was born in Bremen, then a free city, on October 22, 1810, while his parents were traveling in Europe for pleasure. His father, Bohl Bohlen Luehrs, was a German-born (1754 in Schiffdorf, Lower Saxony, Germany) naturalized citizen of the United States and lived in Philadelphia. His mother was Johanna Magdalene Oswald Hahn, a German-American born 1770 in New York. When Bohlen was very young, his father placed him in the military Academy in Delft, Netherlands. In 1832 however, he was called to the U.S. before he had completed his studies. He did not return to Germany to complete his studies. After emigrating to the United States, Bohlen became a rich dealer of foreign wines and liquor.

=== Mexican-American War ===
When war with Mexico broke out he accepted a position on the staff of his friend and companion, General Worth, as a volunteer Aide-de-camp. During the war he participated in all the battles under Major-General Winfield Scott. When the war ended he resigned his commission and returned to selling liquor in Philadelphia.

=== Crimean War ===
Due to the health of his son, he traveled to Europe. When the Crimean War broke out, he entered the service of the allies, on the French staff. During the war he took part in the siege, storming and the final surrender of Sevastopol. After the war ended, he lived in the Netherlands until he heard word of the firing on and surrender of Fort Sumter.

=== American Civil War ===
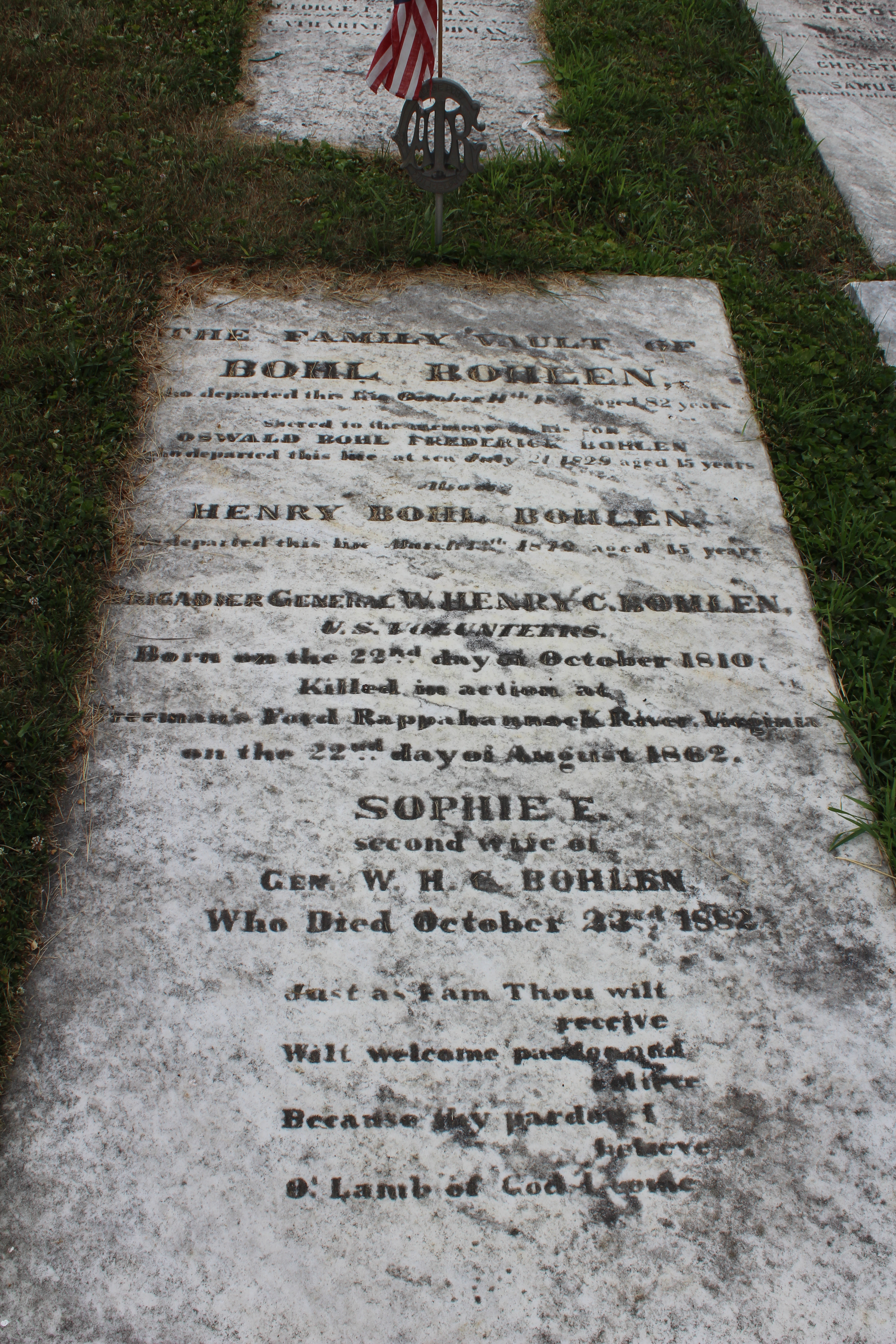
Henry Bohlen tombstone in Laurel Hill Cemetery

In 1861 he was granted permission to recruit a regiment in Philadelphia, which was made up of mostly German emigrants. He played a key role in organizing the 75th Pennsylvania Volunteer Infantry, and he was named its Colonel and commander on September 30, 1861. He served in the division of Louis Blenker. In his report on the medical condition of the Army of the Potomac in February 1862, the army's chief surgeon and medical director, Charles Tripler, reported that just over 5 percent of Bohlen's brigade was listed as sick, which was on par with the other brigades in Blenker's division. The medical report gave Bohlen's strength as follows: 58th New York Infantry Regiment, 650; the 35th Pennsylvania Infantry Regiment, 732; and the 40th Pennsylvania Infantry Regiment, 868, for a total strength of 2,250.

Bohlen was appointed Brigadier General, U.S. Volunteers, on April 28, 1862. He commanded the 3rd Brigade of Carl Schurz's Division in the Valley Campaign against Stonewall Jackson in the spring of 1862. His brigade participated in the Battle of Cross Keys, 8 June 1862, but did not fight at the Battle of Cedar Mountain, 9 August 1862, as Sigel's division was encamped at Culpeper Court House at the time of the battle.

At the Battle of Cross Keys, Bohlen supported the brigade of Julius Stahel of Blenker's division. Bohlen formed his troops behind Stahel's just to the east of the Port Republic Road, southwest of the Evers house. Bohlen's brigade comprised the 54th New York Infantry Regiment on the left, the 58th New York Infantry Regiment, the 74th Pennsylvania Infantry Regiment, and, on the right, the 75th Pennsylvania Infantry Regiment. Battery I of the 1st New York Light Artillery Regiment occupied the center. Bohlen positioned this battery forward of his infantry. An artillery officer in Blenker's division moved this battery without Bohlen's permission. Bohlen moved it back again. When the artillery officer ordered the battery to move a half a mile to the rear, Bohlen belayed that order, but the battery moved anyway, "against my positive order to remain."

On 21 August, Confederate General Robert E. Lee marched his army north along the Rappahannock river. His objective was to cross the river beyond the enemy's right flank. Union General John Pope anticipated this move and defended the various fords to the north of Rappahannock Station. The afternoon of 22 August, Bohlen's corps commander, General Franz Sigel, sent Bohlen's infantry brigade across the river to reconnoiter the ground to the west of Freeman's Ford. Once across, Bohlen formed a skirmish line to go forward. It soon made contact with Confederate General Isaac Trimble's infantry brigade, hidden in heavy woods. Trimble attacked. Bohlen committed his entire brigade to the fight, but the enemy proved too strong. Bohlen gave the order to withdraw, and his men retreated back across the Rappahannock One of Bohlen's men admitted that the brigade retreated "so fast that we came near forgetting to stop."

In his official report, Confederate General Robert E Lee described the fight as "a short but spirited engagement," in which Bohlen's brigade sustained "heavy loss." Union General John Pope, the commander of the Army of Virginia, mentioned Bohlen's death briefly in his official report, dated 24 August 1862: "Our losses during the last three days have been quite heavy, among the killed being Brigadier-General Bohlen, commanding a brigade in Sigel's corps"

On August 26, 1862, The New York Times reprinted an article from The Philadelphia Press about the death of Bohlen:

And the army was safely across the Rappahannock, still nearest the enemy, Bohlen's brigade was fighting continually, and unfortunately for the country and its cause ... Bohlen was observed by a rebel sharpshooter, while riding across the field, directing the movements of his troops, and shot through the head.

According to another account, Bohlen was shot through the heart as he tried to rally his troops, tumbling dead from his horse and into the river. Though Bohlen probably died instantly, a private of the 61st Ohio Volunteer Infantry Regiment claimed to hear the fatally wounded general call out, "Boys, I am dead, but go and fight!"

There were rumors that Bohlen was killed by one of his own men, but evidence suggests that he was liked by his troops and that he died from a shot by a Confederate sharpshooter.

The Confederates took custody of Bohlen's corpse until it could be returned to his unit. On 10 September 1862, a truce was arranged. An officer of Bohlen's staff retrieved the remains. Bohlen was buried in Laurel Hill Cemetery in Philadelphia.

== Family ==
Henry Bohlen married Emily Mary Borie of Philadelphia. They had two daughters: Sophie (1837–1915) who married Gustav von Bohlen und Halbach and Anita Agnes Clementine (1841–1929) who married Willem Gerard Brantsen Baron van de Zijp. The Bohlen family tree includes his grandson German industrialist Gustav Krupp von Bohlen und Halbach, son of his daughter Sophie, and his great-great-nephew Charles Bohlen a United States diplomat from 1929 to 1969 and Soviet expert.

== See also ==
- List of American Civil War generals (Union)
- Charles Saalmann an infantry officer who initially served under Henry Bohlen during Bohlen's command of the 75th Pennsylvania Regiment of Volunteer infantry.
