= Unitia, Tennessee =

Unincorporated community in Tennessee, US

Coordinates: 35.7467456°N 84.1796363°W

Unitia is an Unincorporated community of Loudon County, Tennessee. Historically it was a crossroads village, the site of a post office, and a stop on the Underground Railroad. The historical center of the community was flooded in the 1940s by the filling of the reservoir behind Fort Loudoun Dam.

== History ==
The site of Unitia, south of the Tennessee River on Cloyd Creek near its confluence with the river, was the location of a Cherokee encampment before 1770.

Unitia was settled by Quakers in 1791. The original name of the community may have been Unity.

The community got its first post office in 1818. It closed in 1823, but reopened in 1824 and operated until 1903. In 1825, James Jones, a Quaker, commenced two decades of service as postmaster. The community was identified as a "post village" in 1860. In 1895, a Rand McNally atlas listed Unitia as a community with a post office, a population of 142, and no rail service. Before Loudon County was formed in 1870, Unitia was part of Blount County.

Historians identify Unitia and the nearby community of Friendsville, which was also established by Quakers, as "stations" on the Underground Railroad, despite Tennessee being a Confederate state.

In the 1940s, the filling of the Tennessee Valley Authority reservoir behind Fort Loudoun Dam inundated the part of Unitia that lay closest to the Tennessee River, including Main Street and some homes and commercial establishments.
