= Battle of Cross Keys =

1862 battle of the American Civil War

- Part of the American Civil War
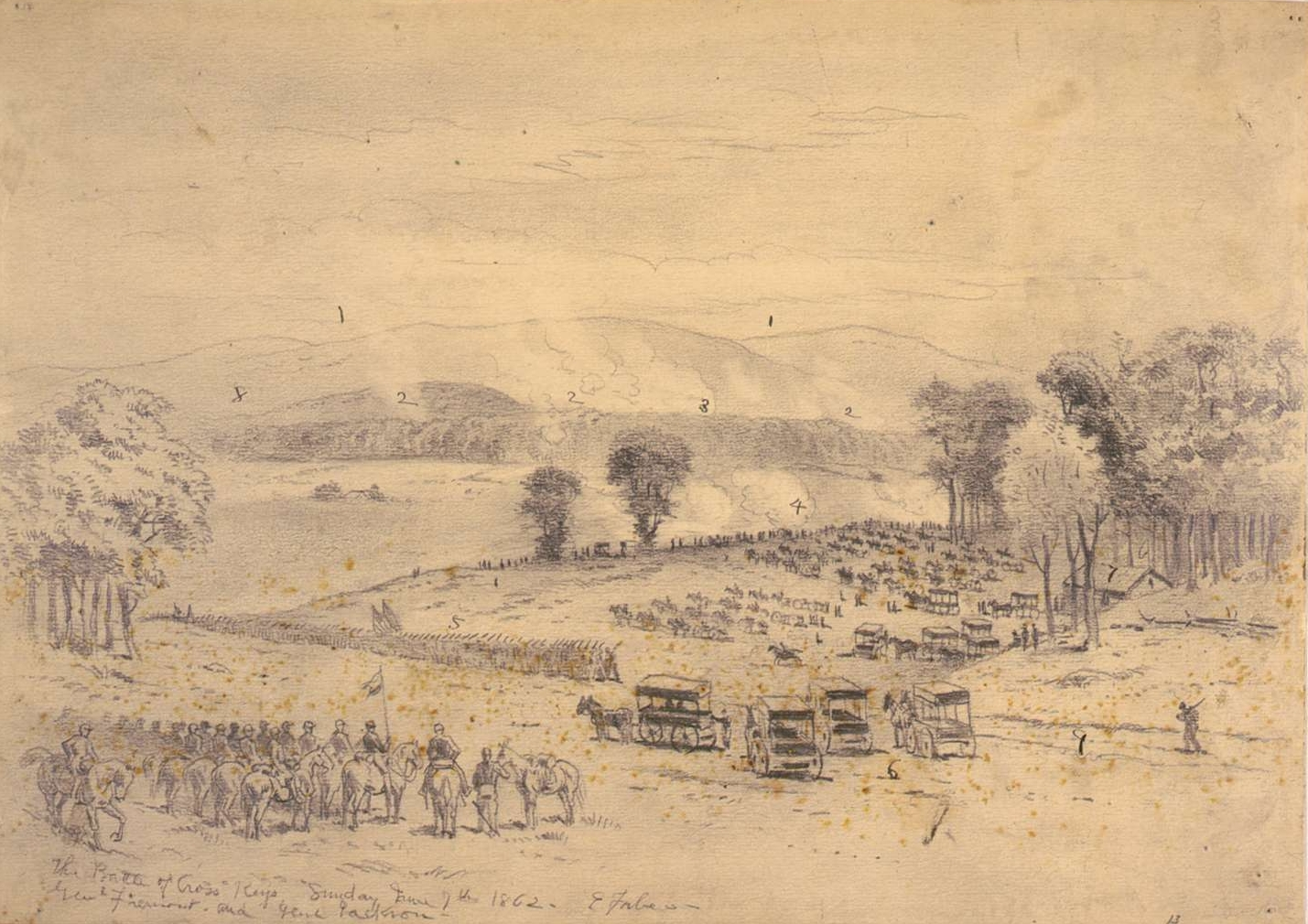
- The battle of Cross Keys--Sunday June 7th 1862--Genl. Fremont and Genl. Jackson by Edwin Forbes [sic]
Date	June 8, 1862
Location	Rockingham County, Virginia 38.3579°N 78.8438°W
Result	Confederate victory

Belligerents
United States (Union)	(Confederate States of America) Confederate States (Confederacy)

Commanders and leaders
John C. Frémont	Richard S. Ewell

Strength
11,500	5,800

Casualties and losses
684 (114 killed; 443 wounded; 127 missing)	287 (42 killed; 230 wounded; 15 missing)

The Battle of Cross Keys was fought on June 8, 1862, in Rockingham County, Virginia, as part of Confederate Army Maj. Gen. Thomas J. "Stonewall" Jackson's campaign through the Shenandoah Valley during the American Civil War. Together, the battles of Cross Keys and Port Republic the following day were the decisive victories in Jackson's Valley campaign, forcing the Union armies to retreat and leaving Jackson free to reinforce Gen. Robert E. Lee for the Seven Days Battles outside Richmond, Virginia.

== Background ==
The hamlet of Port Republic, Virginia, lies on a neck of land between the North and South Rivers, which conjoin to form the South Fork Shenandoah River. On June 6–7, 1862, Jackson's army, numbering about 16,000, bivouacked north of Port Republic, Maj. Gen. Richard S. Ewell's division along the banks of Mill Creek near Goods Mill, and Brig. Gen. Charles S. Winder's division on the north bank of North River near the bridge. The 15th Alabama Infantry regiment was left to block the roads at Union Church. Jackson's headquarters were in Madison Hall at Port Republic. The army trains were parked nearby.

Two Union columns converged on Jackson's position. The army of Maj. Gen. John C. Frémont, about 15,000 strong, moved south on the Valley Pike and reached the vicinity of Harrisonburg on June 6. The division of Brig. Gen. James Shields, about 10,000, advanced south from Front Royal in the Luray (Page) Valley, but was badly strung out because of the muddy Luray Road. At Port Republic, Jackson possessed the last intact bridge on the North River and the fords on the South River by which Frémont and Shields could unite. Jackson determined to check Frémont's advance at Mill Creek, while meeting Shields on the east bank of the South Fork of the Shenandoah River. A Confederate signal station on Massanutten monitored Union progress.

Early in the morning on June 8, Frémont's men encountered the Confederate advanced guard near Cross Keys Tavern. A few shots were fired and the Union cavalry fell back onto their main body, which was approaching. Darkness prevented further developments.

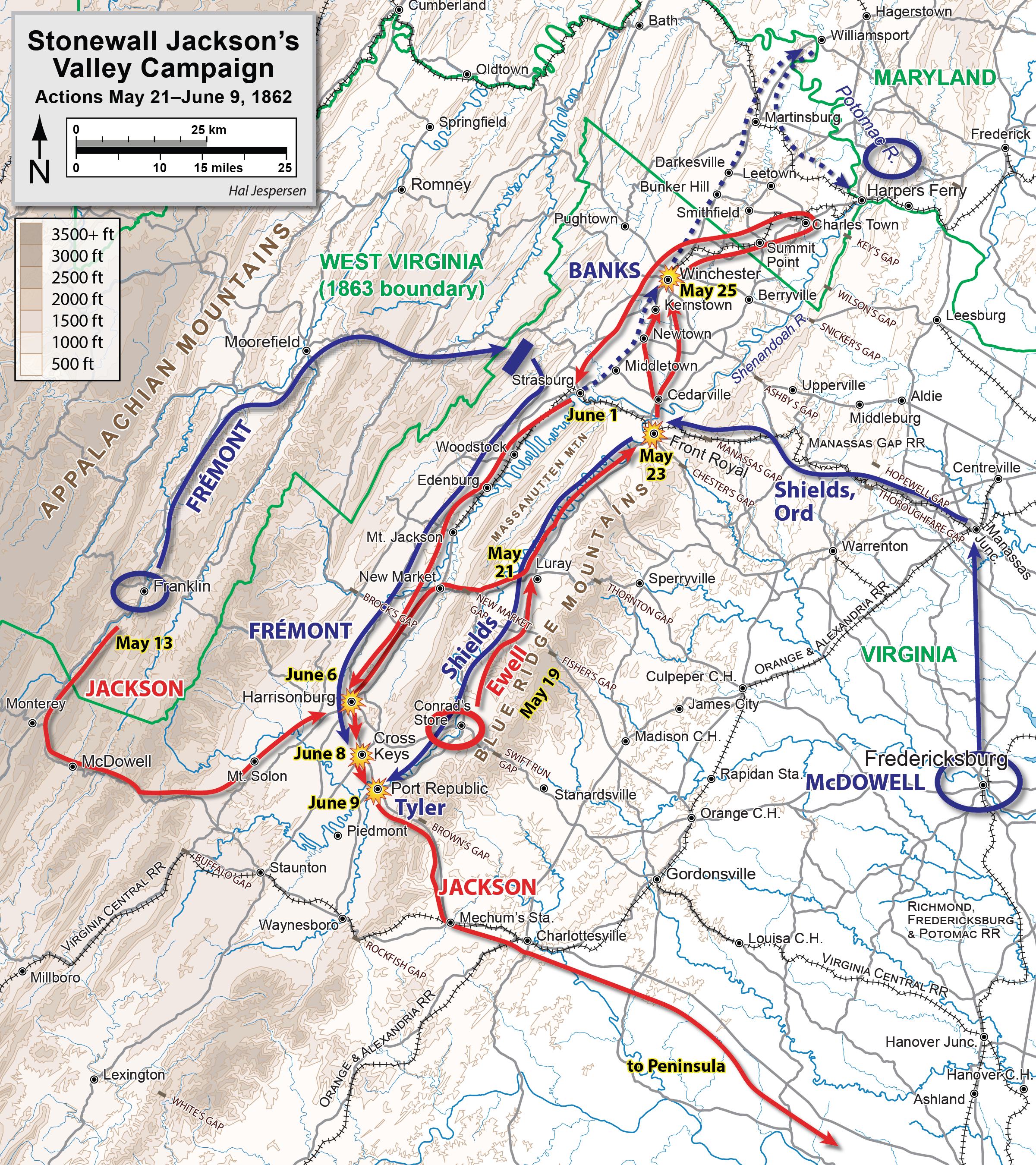
Jackson's Valley Campaign: Front Royal to Port Republic Confederate Union

== Battle ==
Colonel Samuel S. Carroll, at the head of a regiment of Union cavalry, supported by an artillery battery and a brigade of infantry, was sent ahead by Shields to secure the North River Bridge at Port Republic. Shortly after dawn (June 8), Carroll scattered the Confederate pickets, forded the South River, and dashed into Port Republic. Jackson and his staff raced down the main street from headquarters and across the bridge, narrowly eluding capture (three members of his staff were captured: Col. Stapleton Crutchfield, Lt. Edward Willis, and Dr. Hunter McGuire). Carroll deployed one gun aimed at the bridge and brought up another. Jackson directed the defense, ordering Captain William T. Poague's battery to unlimber on the north bank. Captain James McD. Carrington brought up a gun from the vicinity of Madison Hall to rake the Main Street. Col. Samuel V. Fulkerson led his 37th Virginia Infantry in a charge across the bridge, where the gun at the opposite end was firing on them with grape shot, to drive the Union cavalry out of the town. Carroll retreated in confusion, losing his two guns, before his infantry could come within range. Three Confederate batteries unlimbered on the bluffs east of Port Republic on the north bank of the South Fork and fired on the retreating Federals. Carroll retired several miles north on the Luray Road. Jackson stationed Brig. Gen. William B. Taliaferro's brigade in Port Republic and positioned the Stonewall Brigade near Bogota with the artillery to prevent any further surprises.

Meanwhile, Frémont, with Col. Gustave P. Cluseret's brigade in the lead, renewed his advance from the vicinity of Harrisonburg. After driving away the Confederate skirmishers, Cluseret reached and deployed his right flank along the Keezletown Road near Union Church. One by one, the Union brigades came into line: Brig. Gen. Robert C. Schenck on Cluseret's right, Brig. Gen. Robert H. Milroy on his left, and Brig. Gen. Julius H. Stahel on the far left, his left flank near Congers Creek. Brig. Gen. Henry Bohlen's and Col. John A. Koltes's brigades were held in reserve near the center of the line. A regiment of Union cavalry moved south on the road to secure the right flank. Batteries were brought to the front.

Ewell deployed his infantry division behind Mill Creek, Brig. Gen. Isaac R. Trimble's brigade on the right across the Port Republic Road, Brig. Gen. Arnold Elzey's in the center along the high bluffs. Ewell concentrated his artillery (4 batteries) at the center of the line. As Union troops deployed along Keezletown Road, Trimble advanced his brigade a quarter of a mile to Victory Hill and deployed Courtenay's (Latimer's) battery on a hill to his left supported by the 21st North Carolina Infantry Regiment. The 15th Alabama, which had been skirmishing near Union Church, rejoined the brigade. Trimble held his regiments out of sight behind the crest of the hill.

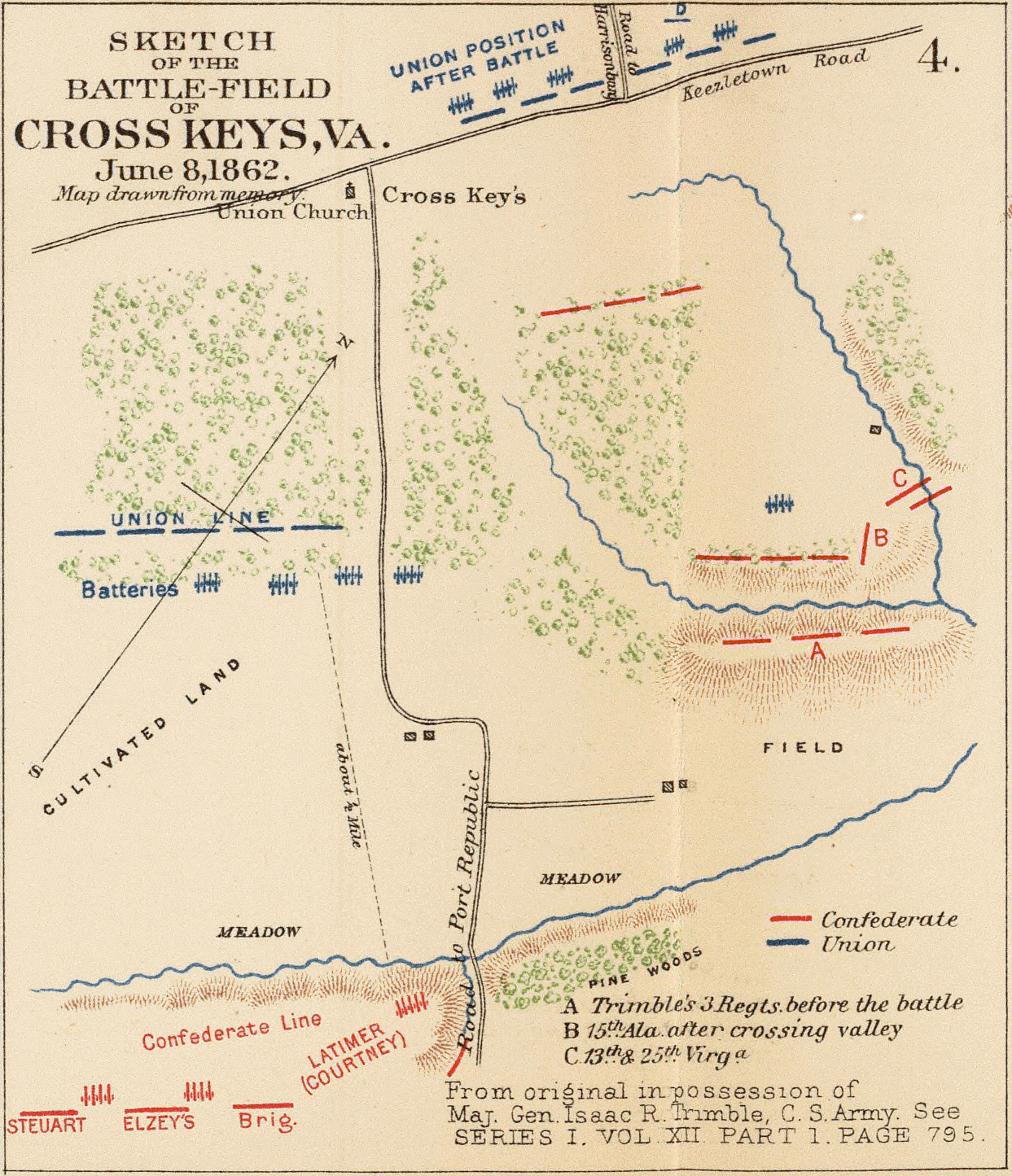
Sketch of the battle-field of Cross Keys, Va.

Frémont determined to advance his battle line with the evident intention of enveloping the Confederate position, assumed to be behind Mill Creek. This maneuver required an elaborate right wheel. Stahel's brigade on the far left had the farthest distance to cover and advanced first. Milroy moved forward on Stahel's right and rear. Union batteries were advanced with infantry lines south of Keezletown Road and engaged Confederate batteries. Stahel appeared oblivious to Trimble's advanced position. His battle line passed down into the valley, crossed the run, and began climbing Victory Hill. Suddenly, Trimble's men leaped up and fired all at once into Stahel's brigade. The Confederates were mostly armed with smoothbore muskets, which they loaded with buck and ball shot, and the effect at such close range was completely devastating; Stahel lost 300 men in a matter of moments and the remainder of the green, untested soldiers fled in panic. The Union brigade regrouped on the height opposite Victory Hill but made no effort to renew their assault. Different accounts of the battle place various estimates at how close Trimble was to Stahel when his men opened fire, but 40 yards seems to be a probable distance. The entire episode lasted no more than a minute as the amount of smoke from 1,300 muskets firing quickly made it impossible to see anything and most of the Confederates got off no more than one shot before Stahel's brigade broke and ran.

Stahel did not renew his attack but brought up a battery (Buell's) to support his position. Trimble moved the 15th Alabama by the right flank and up a ravine to get on the battery's left. In the meantime, Ewell sent two regiments (13th and 25th Virginia) along the ridge to Trimble's right, attracting a severe fire from the Union battery. With a shout, the 15th Alabama emerged from their ravine and began to climb the hill toward the battery, precipitating a melee. Trimble advanced his other two regiments (16th Mississippi Infantry Regiment on the left and 21st Georgia Infantry on the right) from their position on Victory Hill, forcing back the Union line. The Union battery limbered hastily and withdrew, saving its guns. A Union regiment counterattacked briefly, striking the left flank of the 16th Mississippi, but was forced back in desperate fighting.

Trimble continued advancing up the ravine on the Confederate right, outflanking successive Union positions. In the meantime, Milroy advanced on Stahel's right, supported by artillery. Milroy's line came within rifle-musket range of the Confederate center behind Mill Creek and opened fire. Union batteries continued to engage Confederate batteries in an artillery duel. Bohlen advanced on the far Union left to stiffen Stahel's crumbling defense. Milroy's left flank was endangered by Stahel's retreat, and Frémont ordered him to withdraw. Jackson brought Taylor's brigade forward to support Ewell if needed, but Taylor remained in reserve on the Port Republic Road near Union Church.

Seemingly paralyzed by the decimation of Stahel's brigade on his left, Frémont was unable to mount a coordinated attack. He ordered Schenck's brigade forward to find the Confederate left flank south of Union Church. Ewell reinforced his left with elements of Elzey's brigade. Severe firing erupted along the line but quickly died down. Confederate Brig. Gen. Elzey and Brig. Gen. George H. Steuart were wounded in this exchange. Frémont withdrew his force to Keezletown Road, placing his artillery on the heights to his rear (Oak Ridge). Artillery firing continued.

== Aftermath ==
Union casualties totaled 557 killed and wounded and 100 captured, while the Confederates lost fewer than 300 men. At dusk, Trimble pushed his battle line forward to within a quarter mile of the Union position, anticipating a night assault. Confederate accounts describe the Union soldiers going into camp, lighting fires, and making coffee. Schenck sent out a company to probe the Confederate positions after dark, but after a brief skirmish the company withdrew and no other engagements took place. During the night, Ewell ordered Trimble to withdraw without making the attack.

== Battlefield preservation ==
The Civil War Trust (a division of the American Battlefield Trust) and its partners have acquired and preserved 282 acres (114 ha) of the battlefield. A key purchase was the 51-acre (21 ha) Widow Pence Farm in the heart of the battlefield. The trust joined with a local retired surgeon, Irvin Hess, and his wife to purchase the property at auction. The couple has since fully restored the circa 1840 farmhouse. The land is protected through a conservation easement.

In March 2022, the "Talbot Boys" statue was relocated to the battlefield from Talbot County, Maryland. The Confederate monument had stood in front of the Talbot County Courthouse since 1916, and was the last remaining Confederate monument on public grounds in Maryland when it was removed after years-long protests.

== Gallery ==
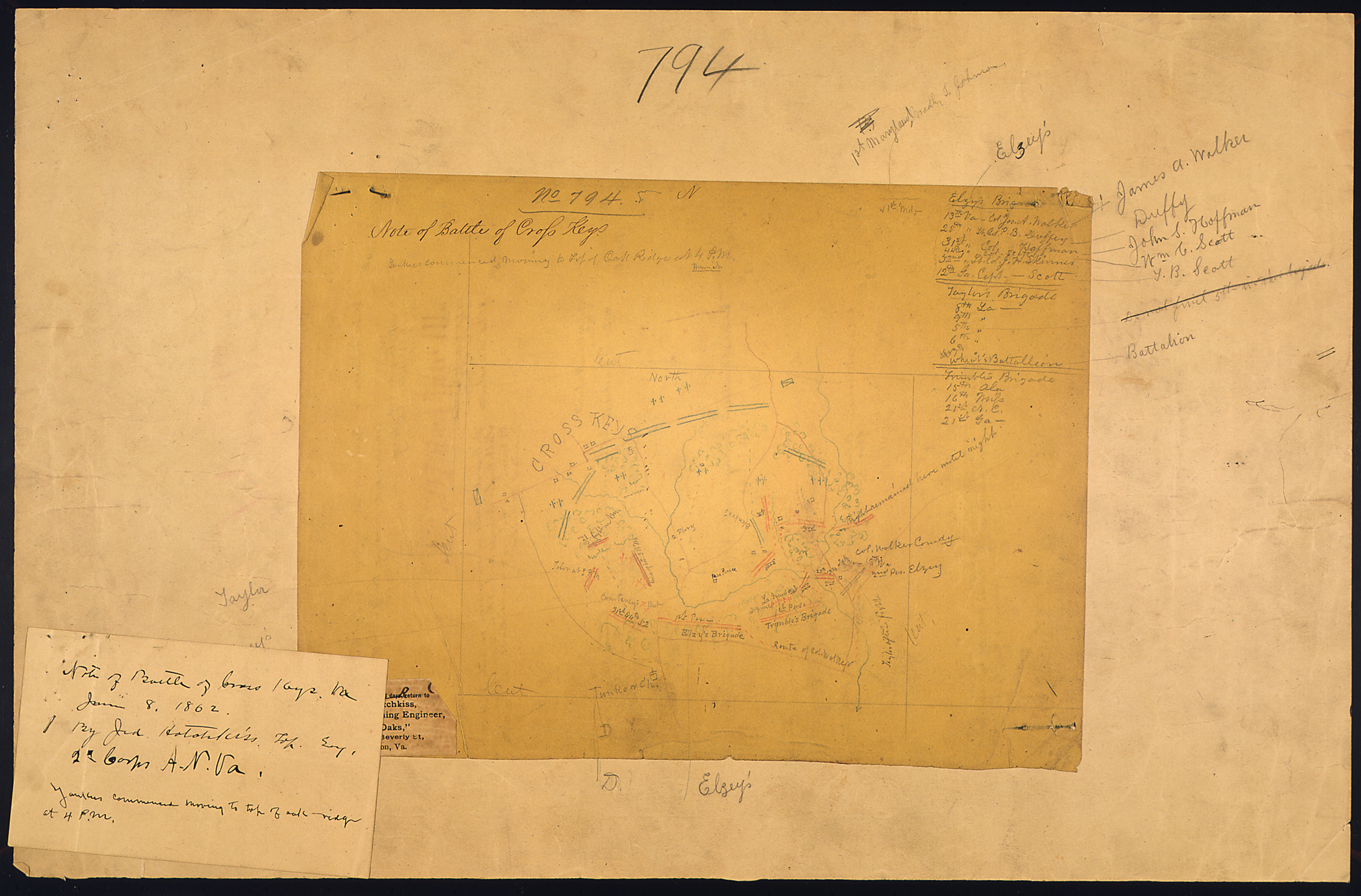
Rough sketch of the Battlefield of Cross Keys, June 8, 1862, compiled by Jed. Hotchkiss

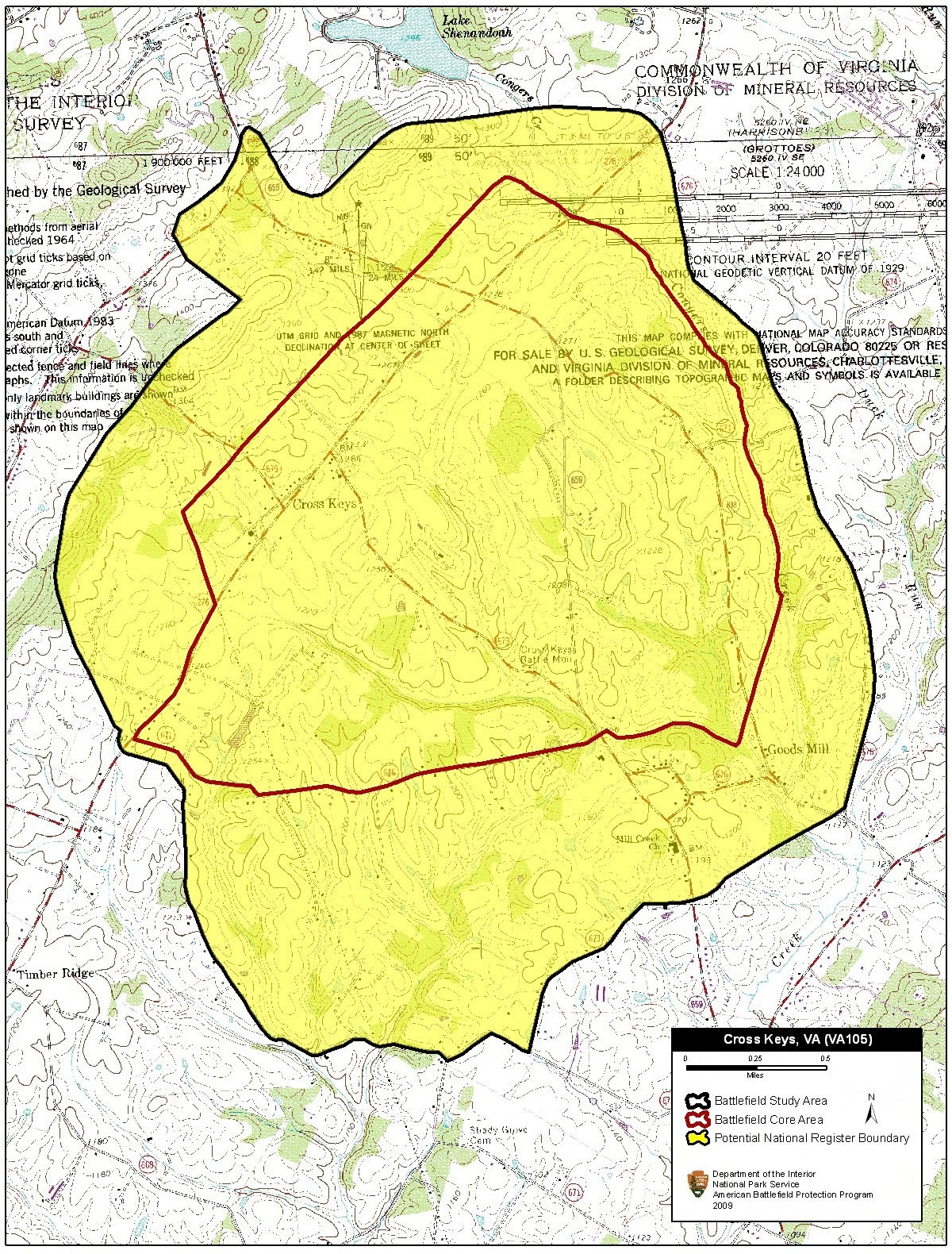
Map of battlefield core and study areas by the American Battlefield Protection Program

== See also ==
- Nicolae Dunca

== Bibliography ==
- Allen, William (1995). Stonewall Jackson's Valley Campaign: From November 4, 1861 to June 17, 1862 (eBook). New York: Smithmark Publishers. p. 284. ISBN 9780831714321. OCLC 33418359.
- Avirett, James Battle (1867). The Memoirs of General Turner Ashby and His Compeers (PDF). Baltimore, MD: Selby & Dulany. p. 408. OCLC 3184269. This article incorporates text from this source, which is in the public domain.
- Clark, Champ (1984). Decoying the Yanks: Jackson's Valley Campaign. The Civil War. Alexandria, VA: Time Life Books. ISBN 080944724X. OCLC 473681924.
- Cozzens, Peter (2013) [2008]. Shenandoah 1862: Stonewall Jackson's Valley Campaign (Kindle). Civil War America. Chapel Hill: The University of North Carolina Press. ISBN 9781469605234. OCLC 1100952647.
- Douglas, Henry Kyd (1993) [1940]. I Rode with Stonewall. Marietta, Georgia: R. Bemis Publishing. ISBN 9780891760405.
- Dyer, Frederick H (1908). A Compendium of the War of the Rebellion (PDF). Des Moines, IA: Dyer Pub. Co. ASIN B01BUFJ76Q. OCLC 8697590. This article incorporates text from this source, which is in the public domain.
- Eicher, David J.; McPherson, James M.; McPherson, James Alan (2001). The Longest Night: A Military History of the Civil War. New York: Simon & Schuster. ISBN 0743218469. OCLC 892938160.
- Emberton, Keith D. (1996). Joint Military Operations Department (ed.). Operational Leadership Once Beyond the Culminating Point: Perspectives on Calculated Tactical Risk to Achieve Operational Success (PDF). Alexandria, VA: United States Naval War College. p. 28. OCLC 38196522. Archived from the original (PDF) on September 28, 2012.
- Esposito, Vincent J. (1959). West Point Atlas of American Wars. Vol. 1: 1689–1900 (1st ed.). New York: Frederick A. Praeger Publishers. OCLC 5890637. This article incorporates text from this source, which is in the public domain.
- Freeman, Douglas Southall (1970) [1946]. Manassas to Malvern Hill (PDF). Lee's Lieutenants: A Study in Command. Vol. I. New York: Charles Scribner's Sons. p. 773. ISBN 0684187485. OCLC 1035890441.
- Gallagher, Gary W.; Berkey, Jonathan M.; Bohannon, Keith S.; Carmichael, Peter S.; Koeniger, A. Cash; Krick, R. E. L.; Krick, Robert K.; Miller, William J. (2010). Gary W. Gallagher (ed.). The Shenandoah Valley Campaign of 1862 (Kindle). Military Campaigns of the Civil War (Kindle ed.). Chapel Hill: University of North Carolina Press. p. 280. ISBN 978-0807857687. OCLC 929629850.
- Henderson, George Francis Robert (1898). Stonewall Jackson and the American Civil War (PDF). Vol. I (1st ed.). London: Longmans, Green, and Company. p. 648. OCLC 1085324715.
- Hotchkiss, Jedediah (1973). Archie P. MacDonald (ed.). Make Me a Map of the Valley: The Civil War Journal of Stonewall Jackson's Topographer (PDF). Dallas: Southern Methodist University Press. p. 352. ISBN 0870741373. OCLC 462213398.
- Johnson, Robert Underwood; Buel, Clarence Clough (1887). Robert Underwood Johnson; Clarence Clough Buel (eds.). The Opening Battles. Battles and Leaders of the Civil War: Being for the Most Part Contributions by Union and Confederate officers: Based upon "The Century War Series". Vol. I. New York: The Century Company. p. 784. OCLC 48764702. This article incorporates text from this source, which is in the public domain.
- Kennedy, Frances H., ed. (1998). The Civil War Battlefield Guide (2nd ed.). Boston: Houghton Mifflin Co. ISBN 0395740126.
- Krick, Robert K. (1996). Conquering the Valley: Stonewall Jackson at Port Republic (PDF) (1st ed.). New York: William Morrow & Co. p. 594. ISBN 9780688112820. OCLC 1148596552.
- McPherson, James M. (1988). Battle Cry of Freedom: The Civil War Era (PDF). Oxford History of the United States (1st ed.). Oxford, UK: Oxford University Press. p. 904. ISBN 9780195038637. OCLC 7577667.
- Martin, David G. (1988). Jackson's Valley Campaign: November 1861 –June 1862 (PDF) (1st ed.). New York: Gallery Books. p. 184. ISBN 9780914373148. OCLC 1194435392.
- Miller, William J. (1993). Mapping for Stonewall: The Civil War Service of Jed Hotchkiss (1st ed.). Washington, DC: Elliott & Clark Pub. p. 176. ISBN 9781880216118.
- Robertson, James I. Jr. (1997). Stonewall Jackson: The Man, The Soldier, The Legend (PDF). London: Prentice Hall International. p. 950. ISBN 9780028646855. OCLC 1151321680.
- Salmon, John S. (2001). The Official Virginia Civil War Battlefield Guide. Mechanicsburg, PA: Stackpole Books. ISBN 0811728684.
- Tanner, Robert G (1976). Stonewall in the Valley: Thomas J. "Stonewall" Jackson's Shenandoah Valley Campaign, Spring 1862 (PDF). Garden City, NY: Doubleday. ISBN 0385121482. OCLC 1036885979.
- U.S. War Department (1885). Reports, Mar 17-Jun 25; Operations in Northern Virginia, West Virginia, and Maryland. Mar 17–Sep 2, 1862. The War of the Rebellion: A Compilation of the Official Records of the Union and Confederate Armies. Vol. XII–XXIV-I. Washington, DC: U.S. Government Printing Office. hdl:2027/coo.31924077725921. OCLC 427057. This article incorporates text from this source, which is in the public domain.
- U.S. War Department (1885). Reports, Jun 26–Sep 2; Operations in Northern Virginia, West Virginia, and Maryland. Mar 17–Sep 2, 1862. The War of the Rebellion: A Compilation of the Official Records of the Union and Confederate Armies. Vol. XII–XXIV-II. Washington, DC: U.S. Government Printing Office. hdl:2027/coo.31924077728222. OCLC 427057. This article incorporates text from this source, which is in the public domain.
- Welcher, Frank J. (1989). The Eastern Theater. The Union Army, 1861–1865: Organization and Operations. Vol. 1 (1st ed.). Bloomington: Indiana University Press. p. 1084. ISBN 9780253364531. OCLC 799063447.
- National Park Service battle description This article incorporates text from this source, which is in the public domain.
- CWSAC Report Update This article incorporates text from this source, which is in the public domain.
- NPS report on battlefield condition This article incorporates text from this source, which is in the public domain.
