= German Americans in the American Civil War =

German-Americans were the largest ethnic contingent to fight for the Union in the American Civil War. More than 200,000 native-born Germans, along with another 250,000 1st-generation German-Americans, served in the Union Army, notably from New York, Wisconsin, and Ohio. Several thousand also fought for the Confederacy. Most German born residents of the Confederacy lived in Louisiana and Texas. Many others were 3rd- and 4th-generation Germans whose ancestors migrated to Virginia and the Carolinas in the 18th and early 19th centuries.

== Union Army ==
=== German-American army units ===
Approximately 516,000 Union soldiers, or 23.4% of all Union soldiers, were immigrants; about 216,000 of these were born in Germany. New York supplied the largest number of these native-born Germans with 36,000. Behind the Empire State came Wisconsin with 30,000 and Ohio with 20,000.

Scores of individual regiments, such as the 52nd New York, 9th Ohio, 74th Pennsylvania, 32nd Indiana (1st German), 107th Ohio Volunteer Infantry, and the 9th Wisconsin, consisted entirely of German Americans. Major recruiting efforts aimed at German Americans were conducted in Cincinnati, St. Louis, and Milwaukee, among many other cities.

Commonly referred to as "Dutchmen" by other Union soldiers, and "lop-eared Dutch" by Confederates, German-American units, in general, earned a reputation for discipline. Some of them had previously served in European armies, and they brought valuable experience to the Union Army.

=== German-American commanders of note ===
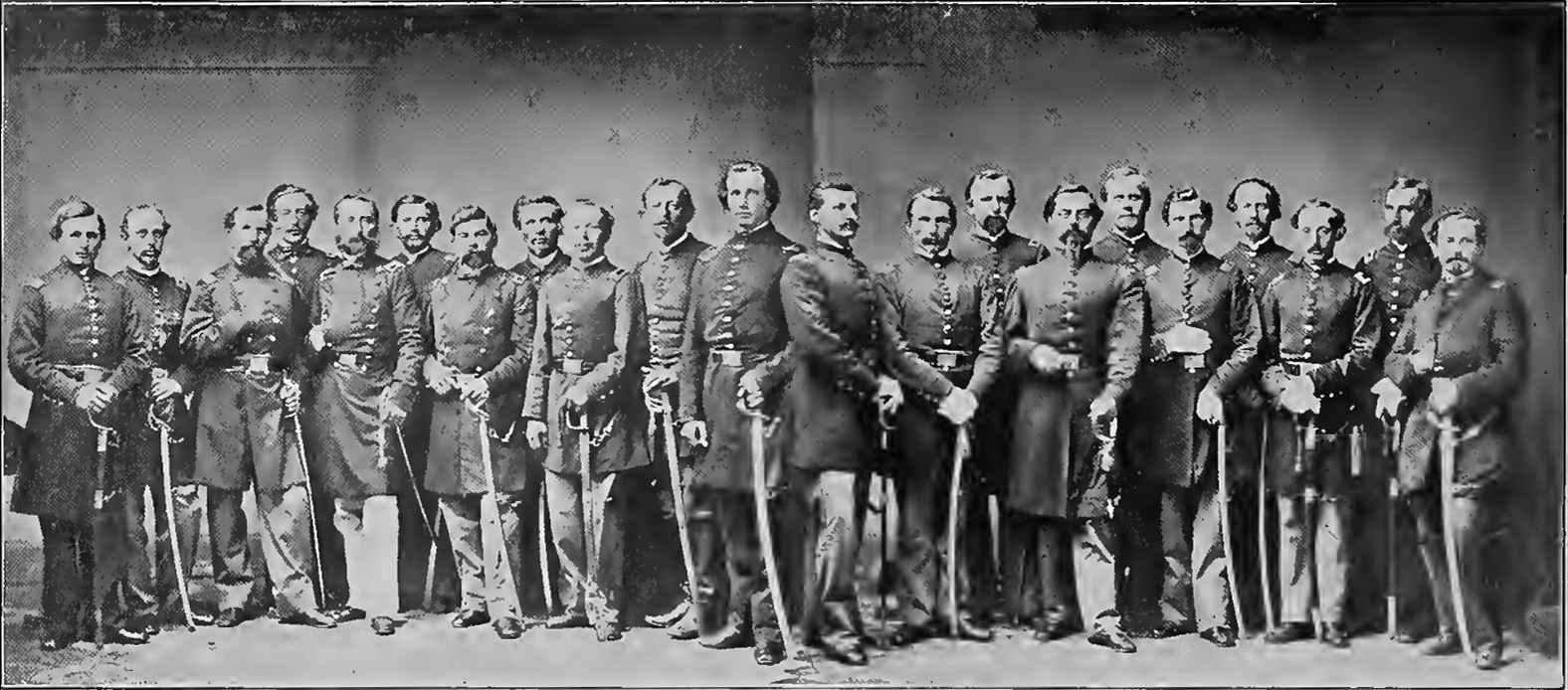
Officer Corps, 20th New York Volunteer Infantry Regiment (the Turner Rifles)

A popular Union commander and native German, Major General Franz Sigel was the highest ranking German-American officer in the Union Army, with many Germans enlisting to "fight mit Sigel." Sigel was a political appointment of President Abraham Lincoln, who hoped that Sigel's immense popularity would help deliver the votes of the increasingly important German segment of the population. He was a member of the Forty-Eighters, a political movement of revolutionaries in German states whose failure led to thousands of Germans emigrating to the United States. These included such future Civil War officers as Maj. Gen. Carl Schurz, Brig. Gen. August Willich, Louis Blenker, Max Weber and Alexander Schimmelfennig.

Schurz was part of the socio-political movement in America known as the Turners, who contributed to getting Lincoln elected as President. The Turners provided the bodyguard at Lincoln's inauguration on March 4, 1861, and also at Lincoln's funeral in April 1865.

Other prominent German generals included Peter Osterhaus, Edward S. Salomon, Frederick Salomon, August Kautz and Felix Salm-Salm. Hundreds of German-born officers led regiments during the war, including Col. Gustav Tafel, Col. Paul A. Frank, Col. Friedrich Hecker, Col. Leopold von Gilsa, and Maj. Jurgen Wilson. Among the very best Union artillerists was German-born Capt. Hubert Dilger, who had been trained at the Karlsruhe Military Academy.

Another famous German American, though not an immigrant, was Brevet Maj. Gen. George Armstrong Custer (Küster). He fought against the Confederate cavalry of Maj. Gen. J.E.B. Stuart at Gettysburg and famously died in the Battle of Little Big Horn during the Indian Wars.

=== Medal of Honor Recipients ===
Among those German immigrants who received the Medal of Honor for valor during the war include:

- Pvt. Frederick Alber
- Cpl. William J. Archinal
- Pvt. Frederick Ballen
- Pvt. Charles Bieger
- Sgt. Richard Binder
- Cpl. Charles Blucher
- Pvt. August F. Bronner
- Sgt. Maj. Abraham Cohn
- Cpt. Hubert Dilger
- Musician Richard Enderlin
- Pvt. Frank E. Fesq
- Civilian Martin Freeman
- 1Sgt. Frederick Füger
- Cpt. M. R. William Grebe
- Cpl. Ignatz Gresser
- Pvt. George Grueb
- Sgt. Henry A. Hammel
- Cpl. Heinrich Hoffman
- Cpl. Luther Kaltenbach
- Pvt. Peter Kappesser
- Cpl. August Kauss
- Pvt. Henry Klein
- Pvt. J. C. Julius Langbein
- Sgt. Andrew Miller
- Pvt. John Miller
- Sgt. Conrad Noll
- Pvt. David Orbansky
- Chief Bugler Ferdinand F. Rohm
- Sgt. Valentine Rossbach
- Pvt. John Schiller
- 1Sgt. Conrad Schmidt
- 1Lt. Theodore Schwan
- Sgt. Martin Schwenk
- Cpl. Charles Shambaugh
- Chief Quartermaster Robert Sommers
- Seaman Henry Thielberg
- Sgt. Ernst Torgler
- Sgt. George Uhrl
- Pvt. Martin Wambsgan
- 1Lt. William Westerhold

== Confederate States Army ==
Although the Confederacy had general officers born in Ireland, France, and England, only one German-born soldier reached that rank in the Confederate Army, General John A. Wagener of South Carolina. Colonel Adolphus Heiman, a Prussian-born veteran of the Mexican–American War who commanded the 10th Tennessee Infantry and later a brigade; and Colonel Augustus Buchel, a native of Hesse and commander of the 1st Texas Cavalry, were probably the next highest ranking German-Confederates.

Lt. Col. Heros von Borcke, who served on the staff of Maj. Gen. Jeb Stuart, is the most famous German officer in the Confederacy. Von Borcke, a Prussian cavalry officer, slipped through the Union blockade into Charleston Harbor and eventually became one of Confederate Maj. Gen. J.E.B. Stuart's closest confidants and his Adjutant and Chief of Staff. In 1866, he returned to Prussia to fight in the Austro-Prussian War.

German immigrant Simon Baruch served 3 years as a Confederate army surgeon, before becoming a leading advocate of hydrotherapy and bath houses in New York City. His son was famous Presidential advisor Bernard Baruch.

== Noted incidents ==
=== Camp Jackson Affair ===
In neutral Missouri on May 9, 1861, Union Capt. Nathaniel Lyon, curious of the Missouri State Guard's intentions for Camp Jackson, engaged in a covert operation to uncover the Guard's plans. Disguised as a woman, Captain Lyon scoured the camp, searching for evidence of any secessionist threat. Lyon and his agents discovered falsely labeled crates containing a number of siege guns to be used for assaulting the Missouri arsenal, sent by the Confederate President Jefferson Davis himself. On May 10, 1861, Lyon, a Radical Republican, marched a large contingent of pro-southern Missouri militia prisoners-of-war through the streets of St. Louis. The men had been captured by a large force composed mostly of German volunteers during an unsuccessful attempt by the pro-southerners to seize the Federal arsenal in St. Louis. The prisoners were guarded by two lines of German-American Union soldiers, who were unpopular with many native-born Missourians, who resented their anti-slavery and anti-secessionist political views. Many people in St. Louis, having moved to the area from Kentucky, Tennessee, North Carolina, and Virginia, had southern sympathies.

Tensions quickly mounted on the streets as civilians hurled fruit, rocks, paving stones, and insults at Lyon's Germans. Shots rang out, killing three militiamen. The soldiers fired into the nearby crowd of bystanders, injuring or killing numerous civilians. Angry mobs rioted throughout the city for the next two days, burning a number of buildings. At least seven more civilians were shot by Federal troops patrolling the streets. The final death toll was 28.

=== Nueces Massacre ===
In the spring of 1862, German Texans from Central Texas and the Texas Hill Country, mostly Unionist or neutral in their political views, were drafted into the Confederate Army over their strong objections. Confederate authorities took their reluctance to serve as a sign of rebellion and sent in troops. A violent confrontation between Confederate soldiers and civilians took place on August 10, 1862, in Kinney County, Texas, leading to the deaths of 34 German Texans who were fleeing to Mexico to avoid the draft.

== See also ==
- Treue der Union Monument
- I Goes to Fight mit Sigel
- American Civil War
- German Texan
- List of German Americans
- German-American Heritage Foundation of the USA
- African Americans in the American Civil War
- Hispanics in the American Civil War
- Irish Americans in the American Civil War
- Italian Americans in the Civil War
- Native Americans in the American Civil War
  - Cherokee
  - Choctaw
- Foreign enlistment in the American Civil War
