= Middlesex County 4-H Fife and Drum Corps =

The Middlesex County 4-H Fife & Drum Corps is fife and drum corps formed in 1972 as a 4-H club in Concord, Massachusetts, in anticipation of that town’s celebration of the United States Bicentennial. Its members come from different towns in Massachusetts and New Hampshire. Members range in age from eight to eighteen. The corps is currently based in Lincoln, Massachusetts.

== Leadership ==
The corps is led by youth leaders. They make decisions about music, determine the program for each event, and work with adult organizers during events. During performances, the youth leaders make all decisions regarding when to play, what to play, and where to march.

== Uniforms and instrumentation ==
The uniform of the corps is green and white, the official colors of the 4-H. The style of the uniform—cocked hats, relatively short vented waistcoats, fall-front breeches, buttoned haversacks, canteens, and leather garters—is based on styles worn in New England in the 1770s.

The corps uses six hole Morneaux "Anna" model fifes as well as rope tension snare drums.

== Performance ==
The Middlesex County 4-H Fife & Drum Corps primarily plays music of the 18th century. The corps plays at musters, Military tattoos, and parades, including the 2004 Democratic National Convention in Boston.

== Recordings ==
- Middlesex County 4-H Fife & Drum Corps (2008)
