= Bieger =

Bieger is a German language surname. It is a nickname for a quarrelsome or pugnacious person. Notable people with the name include:

- Andrea Bieger (born 1959), German gymnast
- Charles Bieger (1844–1930), German soldier
- Jana Bieger (born 1989), American gymnast
