= Mattatuck Drum Band =

American fife and drum corps

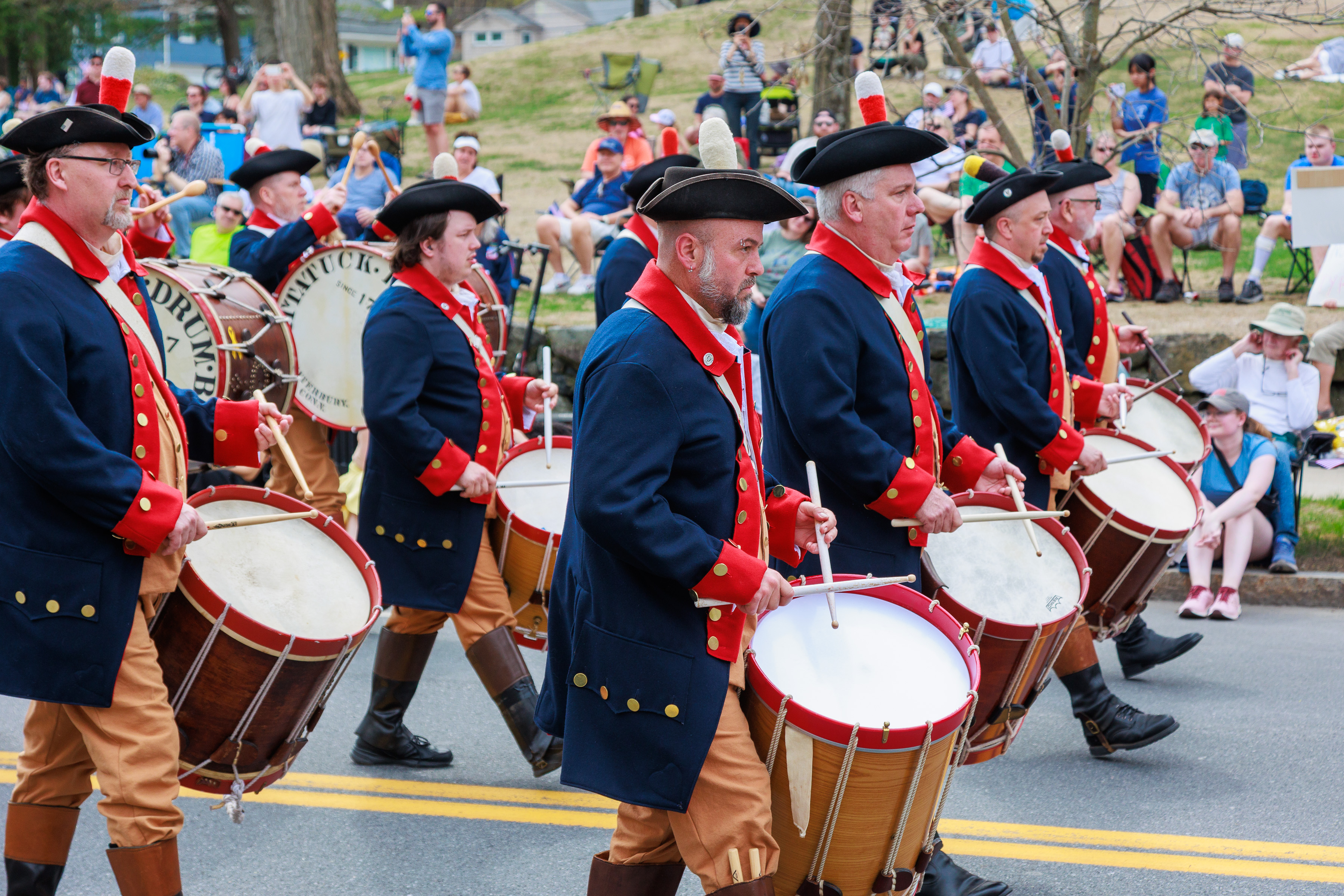
The Mattatuck Drum Band at the 2025 Patriots' Day Parade in Lexington, Massachusetts

The Mattatuck Drum Band is an American fife and drum corps organized in 1767 in Farmingbury, now Wolcott, Connecticut. According to its website, it is the oldest fife and drum corps in the U.S. with continuous membership.
