= Norwood Colonial Boys Fife & Drum Corps =

Norwood Colonial Boys FDC is an Irish-American fife and drum corps based in Norwood, MA. It was founded in 1953 after the dissolution of the Saint Catherine of Siena fife and drum corps in Norwood, MA. The corps has marched in parades around the world playing from a repertoire of traditional Irish songs and historical American tunes, often from the Revolutionary and Civil War eras. The current head of the Board of Directors is John Faherty.

The Colonial Boys were charter members of The Company of Fifers and Drummers and hosted the first National Muster of The Company of Fifers and Drummers in May, 1972.

== Uniform & Equipment ==
Their uniform consists of black jacket with gold lining, black tricorne hat with gold lining, white pants, jabot, and black gaiters with gold buttons.

The design of the current uniform is made to keep in line with the look of the original uniforms from 1953. Far from being an attempt to accurately depict 18th century clothing, the first uniforms of the Colonial Boys were made up of old WWII U.S. Navy uniforms. The sleeves of jackets were cut off and had buttons sewn on to be made as gaiters, and a yellow lining was added to everything. This was done because once the Saint Catherine's Fife and Drum Corps was disbanded, the members had no uniforms to use when they decided to continue marching as an independent group. The mothers of the boys and other women in Norwood's Irish community made the outfits with what they had readily available, and thus the iconic uniform was born. The drum major, who stands behind the Color Guard and in front of the Fife section, wears a three-piece green uniform including a jacket with tales.

The Norwood Colonial Boys play on wooden fifes, with many being simple one-piece fifes. The drummers are majority snare drummers, with several bass drummers who march in the rear. All of the drums are rope drums. The drum major is equipped with a mace. The Color Guard, who lead the unit when in parade formation, always carry the American and Irish flags in each and every parade. Beyond that, the Gadsden flag is often carried, along with the Erin go Bragh flag, Bunker Hill flag, a shamrock flag, the Norwood Colonial Boys flag, Town of Norwood flag, and the Hawaiian state flag. In addition, an honor guardsman armed with a 6-foot long pike often marches to the right of the American flag.

== History ==
The origins of the Corps lies within the tight-knit Irish immigrant community which settled in Norwood almost exclusively from the Irish-speaking region of Connemara in Galway, Ireland and the local Saint Catherine of Siena Parish. In the early 1900s, the children of these Irish immigrants formed together to create the Saint Catherine's Fife & Drum Corps, taught by their local priest. The older boys of the parish, once they outgrew the SCS Corps, banded together and formed the Norwood Fife & Drum Corps which marched through the 1930s and 1940s.

These sibling corps combined the fife & drum tradition of New England with the songs of their homeland, and in fact the majority of the Irish tunes played by corps in the Northeast can be traced back to the exchange of music with the Colonial Boys at musters in the 1960s and 1970s. In exchange, these thoroughly American groups taught the Norwood corps many colonial era songs.

== Junior Corps ==
Over the years, the Colonial Boys have taught several junior corps. Many of the members of these corps later on were promoted to the senior corps and have become the backbone of the corps today. In the 1950s , there was a junior corps called the Liberty Boys which lasted a few years. In the late 1970s and early 1980s, a large junior corps was formed called the Tiots, after the name of the Norwood High School yearbook and Native American name for the town of Norwood. The Tiots marched with the senior corps until a split arose and many Tiots left to form an independent corps known as the Union Brigade. The Tiots who remained with the Colonial Boys began to march as senior members, and most remain so into the present day. Some Union Brigade members also came back in later years and have marched at times with the Colonial Boys. In 2008, another junior version called the Junior Colonial Boys was started. Several of the members are related to members of the older corp. This group marched directly behind the senior corps for three parade seasons until its members were all called up to the corps where they continue to march today.

== List of Notable Parades ==
- 1960’s Multiple St. Patrick’s Day Parades NYC
- 1970 St. Patrick’s Day Parade Dublin, Ireland
- 1970 Cherry Blossom Parade Washington, DC
- 1971 St. Patrick’s Day Parade Dublin, Ireland
- 1988 St. Patrick's Day Parade, Dublin, Ireland
- 1994 St. Patrick's Day Parade, Waikiki, Hawaii
- 1997 Fourth of July Parade, Hawaii
- 2000-2003 St. Patrick's Day Parade, Savannah, Georgia
- 2005-2006 St. Patrick's Day Parade, San Antonio, Texas
- 2011 St. Patrick's Day Parade, Naples, Florida
