= The Girl I Left Behind =

English folk song

External videos
- Podcast: The Civil War and American Art, Episode 7, Smithsonian American Art Museum

The melody of The Girl I Left Behind Me

"The Girl I Left Behind", also known as "The Girl I Left Behind Me", is an English folk song dating back to the Elizabethan era. It is said to have been played when soldiers left for war or a naval vessel set sail. According to other sources the song originated in 1758 when English Admirals Hawke and Rodney were observing the French fleet. The first printed text of the song appeared in Dublin in 1791. A popular tune with several variations, "The Girl I Left Behind Me", may have been imported into America around 1650 as "Brighton Camp", of which a copy dating from around 1796 resides in the Bodleian Library, Oxford.

== Melody ==
The melody is derived from a traditional Irish melody known as An Spailpín Fánach, meaning "The Wandering Labourer", which was collected by Edward Bunting in The Ancient Music of Ireland (1840). An Spailpín Fánach continues to exist as a popular sean-nós song in traditional Irish-speaking communities, although it is unknown whether its lyrics predate "The Girl I Left Behind Me" or if the lyrics were a later addition to the An Spailpín Fánach melody.

== History ==
The first known printed text of a song with this name appeared in the serial song collection The Charms of Melody, Dublin, Ireland, issue no. 72, printed in Dublin from 1791 and in Exshaw's Magazine (Dublin, September 1794). The earliest known version of the melody was printed about 1810 in Hime's Pocket Book for the German Flute or Violin (Dublin), vol. 3, p. 67, under the title "The Girl I left Behind Me" (National Library of Ireland, Dublin). Theodore Ralph claimed that it was known in America as early as 1650, under the name "Brighton Camp", but there is no evidence to support this assumption, and the only known tune of "Brighton Camp" differed from that of the song in question.

It has many variations and verses, for example "Blyth Camps, Or, the Girl I left behind Me" (1812, Newcastle), "Brighton Camp, or the Girl I left behind Me" (1815, Dublin, from which the "Brighton" title probably came), "Nonesuch," and others. Here is one example:

All the dames of France are fond and free
And Flemish lips are really willing
Very soft the maids of Italy
And Spanish eyes are so thrilling

Still, although I bask beneath their smile,
Their charms will fail to bind me
And my heart falls back to Erin's isle
To the girl I left behind me.

A number of Irish-language and English-language songs were set to this tune in Ireland in the 19th century, such as "An Spailpín Fánach" (translated into English as "The Rambling Labourer"), "The Rare Old Mountain Dew" (published New York, 1882) and in the 20th century, such as "Waxie's Dargle".

In England the tune is often known as "Brighton Camp" and is used for Morris dancing.

The hours sad I left a maid
A lingering farewell taking
Whose sighs and tears my steps delayed
I thought her heart was breaking
In hurried words her name I blest
I breathed the vows that bind me
And to my heart in anguish pressed
The girl I left behind me

Then to the east we bore away
To win a name in story
And there where dawns the sun of day
There dawned our sun of glory
The place in my sight
When in the host assigned me
I shared the glory of that fight
Sweet girl I left behind me

Though many a name our banner bore
Of former deeds of daring
But they were of the day of yore
In which we had no sharing
But now our laurels freshly won
With the old one shall entwine me
Singing worthy of our size each son
Sweet girl I left behind me

The hope of final victory
Within my bosom burning
Is mingling with sweet thoughts of thee
And of my fond returning
But should I n'eer return again
Still with thy love i'll bind me
Dishonors breath shall never stain
The name I leave behind me

== U.S. military use in the 19th century ==
The song was popular in the US Regular Army, who used it as a marching tune throughout the 19th century.

These are the lyrics popular among the army in the 19th century:

I'm lonesome since I crossed the hill
And over the moor that's sedgy
Such lonely thoughts my heart do fill
Since parting with my Betsey

I seek for one as fair and gay
But find none to remind me
How sweet the hours I passed away
With the girl I left behind me

During the Civil War, the Confederates had their own version:

Old Abe lies sick, Old Abe lies sick
Old Abe lies sick in bed
He's a lying dog, a crying dog
And I wish that he was dead

Jeff Davis is a gentleman
Abe Lincoln is a fool
Jeff Davis rides a big white horse
And Lincoln rides a mule

The tune was also used in the song I Goes to Fight mit Sigel, which parodied the language and culture of German immigrant soldiers in the Union army. After the assassination of Abraham Lincoln, the ballad "Booth Killed Lincoln" was written using the same tune.

== World War I use ==
In the early stages of WWI, the British army used an obscene version of this song which ran in part:

Kaiser Bill is feeling ill,
the Crown Prince has gone barmy,
We don't give a fuck for old von Kluck
And all his bleedin' army.

== Survival in the oral tradition ==
The song was recorded from the mouths of traditional singers in the twentieth century, particularly in the Ozarks. Hallie Griffin of Conway, Arkansas sang an old version beginning "The maids of France are fond and true" in 1958 to Mary Celestia Parler, which can be heard online via the University of Arkansas digital library.

Bertha Lauderdale of Fayetteville, Arkansas sang a version to Parler beginning "Oh they dressed me up in scarlet red", which she learnt from her Irish grandfather who said it had been sung that way during the American Revolutionary War. This recording can also be heard online courtesy of the University of Arkansas. A third version collected by Parler, which can also be heard online, appears to have been turned into a dance song.

== Other musical forms ==
This tune has been quoted in some pieces of classical music, such as:

- Hamilton Harty's An Irish Symphony
- Roy Harris's Symphony No. 4 Folk Song Symphony
- Blind Tom Wiggins's The Battle of Manassas

Josef Holbrooke wrote a set of orchestral variations on the song.

The theme "The Girl I Left Behind" can be heard as an overlay in Glenn Miller's arrangement of "American Patrol", popularised during World War II.

The song forms a portion of the melody of Guy Mitchell's 1951 hit "Belle, Belle, My Liberty Belle".

== Examples of use in media ==
The song has a march beat and has often been associated with British and American military bands, especially in the context of soldiers heading out to (or returning from) battle. The tune is easy to play on the fife, and is one of two songs often associated with the famous The Spirit of '76 painting, along with "Yankee Doodle". One example in popular culture that illustrates this cliché is at the end of the 1940 Bugs Bunny cartoon, A Wild Hare, in which the bunny marches into the sunset playing the tune on a fife (in reality, a carrot) and affecting a stiff leg as with the fifer in the painting. Bugs later plays it at the end of the 1950 cartoon Bunker Hill Bunny, accompanied by Yosemite Sam.

The title of Chapter 30 of William Thackeray's Vanity Fair (published in serial form in 1847–1848) is “‘The Girl I Left Behind Me’”. Within the chapter is a further reference to the song: “Jack or Donald marches away to glory with his knapsack on his shoulder, stepping out briskly to the tune of ‘The Girl I left behind me’."

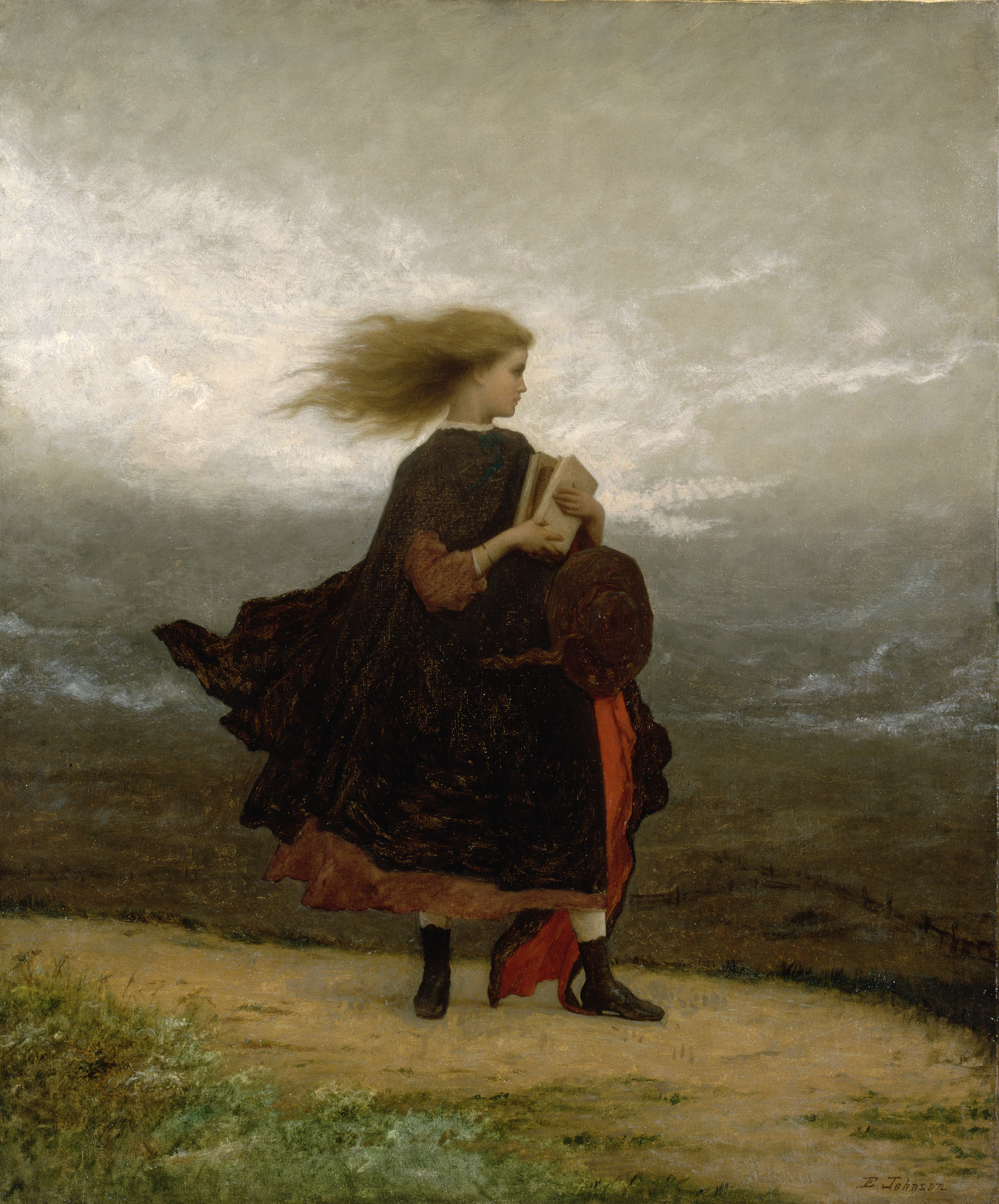
The Girl I Left Behind Me, by Eastman Johnson, early 1870s

The title of Eastman Johnson's painting, made shortly after the American Civil War, was drawn from this ballad.

In the 1980 movie The Long Riders, set several years after the American Civil War, Keith Carradine sings a variant of the song which Oscar Brand has recorded under the title "The Wayward Boy", beginning: "I walk the street with a tap to my feet. I heard a voice above me."

Ewan MacColl's song "Ivor" uses the tune to wryly mock the supposedly favourable treatment given to Ivor Novello in prison during World War II. The tune appears in the Popeye cartoon Popeye the Sailor Meets Sindbad the Sailor. Popeye mumbles to it under his breath as he marches toward his final confrontation with Sindbad. An uptempo version of the tune recorded by Pete Rugolo and His Orchestra served as the opening and closing theme of the 1961–1962 CBS situation comedy Ichabod and Me.

"The Frogs and the Lobsters", an episode of the Hornblower television series, features the tune being played by a band of the Royal Marines, along with the first few bars of "Rule Britannia". Chapter 3 of Hornblower in the West Indies opens with the first few lines of the lyrics. The song appears several times in the TV movie Sharpe's Company. Emphasizing its popularity with British soldiers during the Napoleonic Wars it features prominently in the 1970 movie Waterloo. In particular, it is played during the advance of a British division under the command of Sir Thomas Picton and when the Duke of Wellington orders a general advance at the end of the battle. In a 1960s Beverly Hillbillies episode, the melody is used for the commercial jingle "the best durn soap is Foggy Mountain Soap".

The tune has also been used as a theme for Western films about the Indian Wars, such as a 1915 silent film about George Custer titled The Girl I Left Behind Me and a theme in the soundtrack of John Ford's "cavalry trilogy": Fort Apache, She Wore a Yellow Ribbon and Rio Grande. In the 1968 film The Charge of the Light Brigade a detachment of British soldiers whistle the tune just before the Battle of the Alma; a fife and drum corps plays the song while leading a regiment marching through London in the 1939 film The Four Feathers.

== Popular recordings ==
"The Girl I Left Behind" has been recorded many times, by The Skillet Lickers, Jay Ungar, The Avett Brothers, The Albion Band, Jules Allen and Molly Mason among others. Bing Crosby included the song in a medley on his album 101 Gang Songs (1961). It appeared with the title "Ichabod and Me Theme" as a track on the Pete Rugolo and His Orchestra album TV's Top Themes (1962).

The most common contemporary interpretation of the song, as recorded by the Hot Club of Cowtown, is derived from a 1938 recording by Bob Wills and the Texas Playboys.

I wrote her a letter when I shoulda known better
Asked her to be my wife
Along came a feller who hit me on the smeller
And I almost lost my life

Oh that girl that pretty young girl
That girl I left behind me
With rosy cheeks and curly hair
The girl I left behind me

She rode ahead to the place I said
And always there you'll see
I am true when you get through
Come back and you will find me

The turtle and the frog, the monkey and the dog
The chick, the weasel and the flea
The fuzzy coon and the ugly baboon
They've all got a wife but me

If I ever get off the trail
And the Injuns they don't find me
I'll make my way straight back again
To the girl I left behind me

Last night I slept in a sycamore tree
With the wind and rain all around me
But tonight I'll sleep in a warm feather bed
With the girl I left behind me
