= Hubert Dilger =

German-American U.S. army artillerist of the American Civil War (1836-1911)

Hubert Anton Casimir Dilger
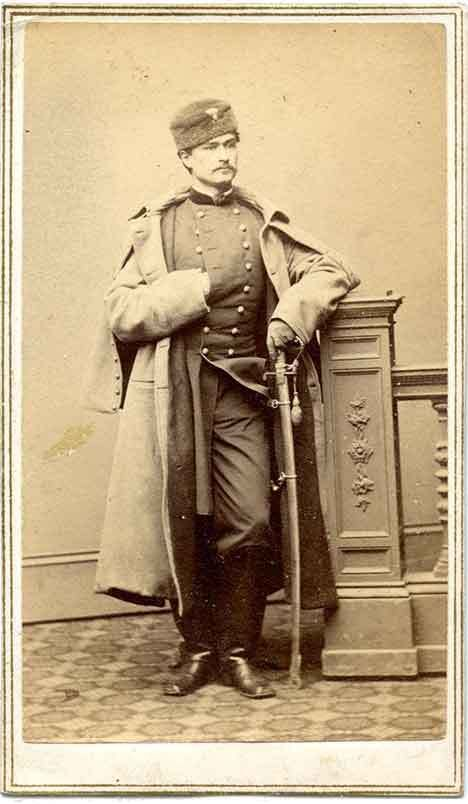
- Born: March 5, 1836; Engen, Konstanz, Grand Duchy of Baden
- Died: May 4, 1911 (aged 75); Front Royal, Virginia, U.S.
- Military career
- Allegiance: Grand Duchy of Baden; United States; Union
- Branch: United States Army; Union Army; Illinois National Guard
- Service years: Before 1861 (Baden); 1861 – 1865 (U.S. Army); 1869 – 1873 (National Guard)
- Rank: Lieutenant (Baden); Captain (United States)
- Unit: Battery I, 1st Ohio Volunteer Light Artillery
- Commands: Battery I, 1st Ohio Light Artillery
- Conflicts: American Civil War; Battle of Chancellorsville; Battle of Gettysburg; Atlanta campaign
- Awards: Medal of Honor

Hubert Anton Casimir Dilger (March 5, 1836 – May 4, 1911). German American who became a decorated artillerist in the Union Army during the American Civil War. He was noted as one of the finest artillerists in the Army of the Potomac and received the Medal of Honor for bravery at the Battle of Chancellorsville (1863). He earned the nickname "Leatherbreeches" for the non-regulation trousers he often wore.

== Early life and career ==
Dilger was born in Engen in the Black Forest region of the Grand Duchy of Baden and educated in the Karlsruhe Military Academy. He served as a lieutenant in the Grand Duke's Horse Artillery at military posts in Gottesau, Karlsruhe, and Rastatt. He developed several innovative theories on artillery tactics and drill.

== American Civil War ==
Captain Hubert Dilger at Resaca, Georgia, May 1864 by Adolph G. Metzner

When news came of the outbreak of the American Civil War, Dilger received a leave of absence and sailed to the United States."

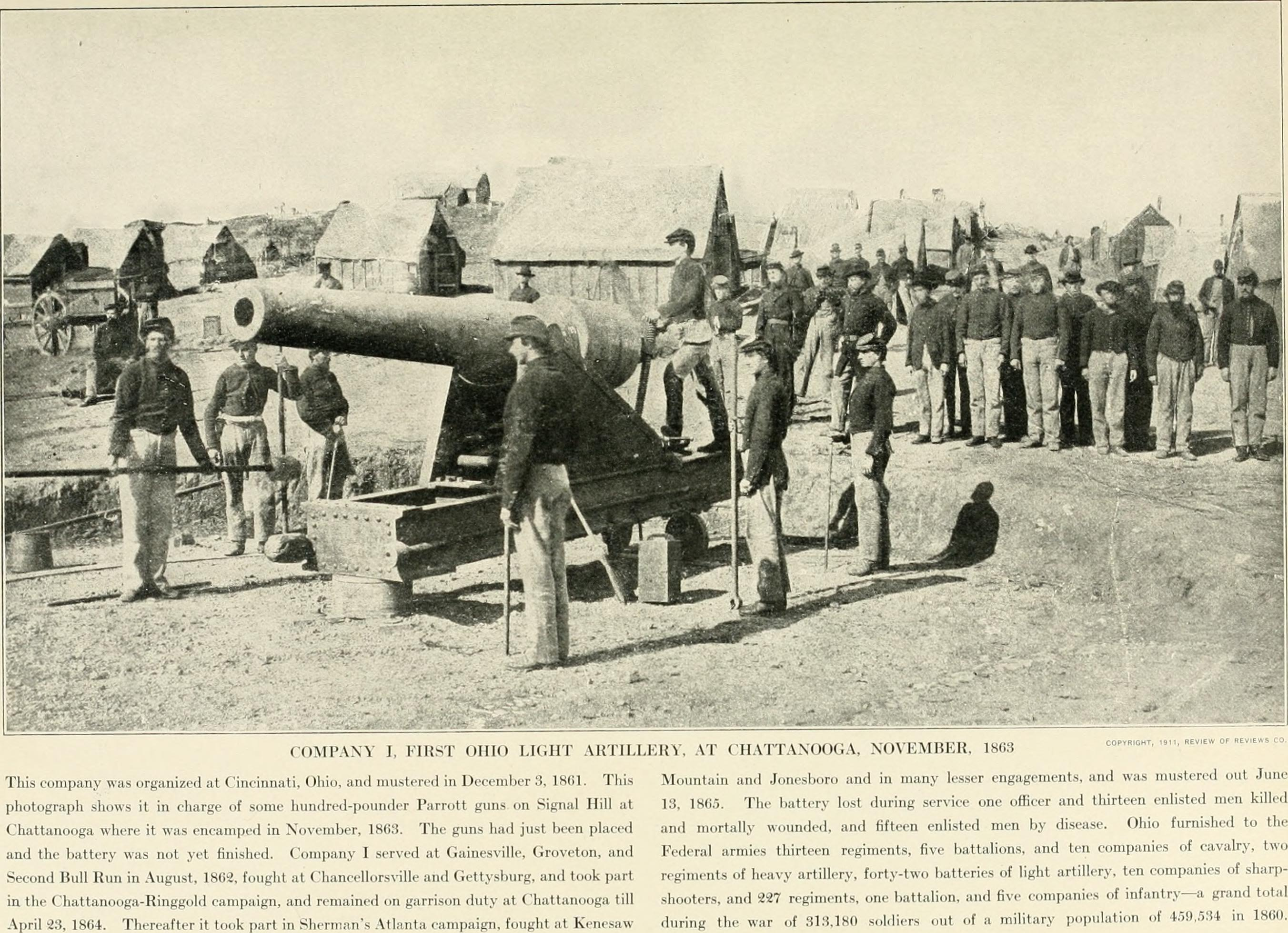
Battery I, 1st Ohio Light Artillery Chattanooga, Tenn November 1863

After relocating to Cincinnati, Ohio, he enlisted in the Union Army, and was appointed captain of Battery I, 1st Ohio Light Artillery; Dilger fought at several battles of the Army of the Potomac, including under fellow German native Major General Carl Schurz at the Second Battle of Bull Run.

On May 2, 1863, Dilger fought in the rearguard of the retreating Union XI Corps during the disastrous Battle of Chancellorsville, for which he eventually was awarded the nation's highest decoration in 1893. He unlimbered his battery of six 12-pounder Napoleon smoothbore cannon as a last-ditch defense against a large portion of Stonewall Jackson's entire corps, which had pushed back XI Corps and was threatening to roll up the Union line.

Dilger also received high praise in the Official Records of the Battle of Gettysburg and for his work in the 1864 Atlanta campaign during which his battery fired the rounds that killed Lt. General Leonidas Polk. Late in the war, he was on garrison duty.

== Postwar ==
From 1869 to 1873, he was Adjutant-General for the State of Illinois.

After the war, Dilger prospered in Ohio and eventually purchased a sprawling horse farm in the Shenandoah Valley near Front Royal, Virginia, where he raised his family. After his death, a portion of his farm was purchased by the US Army as part of the creation of the Front Royal Remount Quartermaster Depot.

His grandson, Captain Carl Anton Keyser, USNR (18 January 1918 - 7 August 1995), served as a Gunnery Officer and later the Executive Officer on board the USS Eberle (DD430) during WW2.

Dilger is buried in Rock Creek Cemetery in Washington, D.C

== Medal of Honor citation ==
The following citation was issued on August 17, 1893:

Fought his guns until the enemy were upon him, then with one gun hauled in the road by hand he formed the rear guard and kept the enemy at bay by the rapidity of his fire and was the last man in the retreat.

== See also ==
- List of Medal of Honor recipients
- List of American Civil War Medal of Honor recipients: A–F
- German Americans in the Civil War
