= Battery I, 1st Ohio Volunteer Light Artillery =

Battery I, 1st Ohio Light Artillery
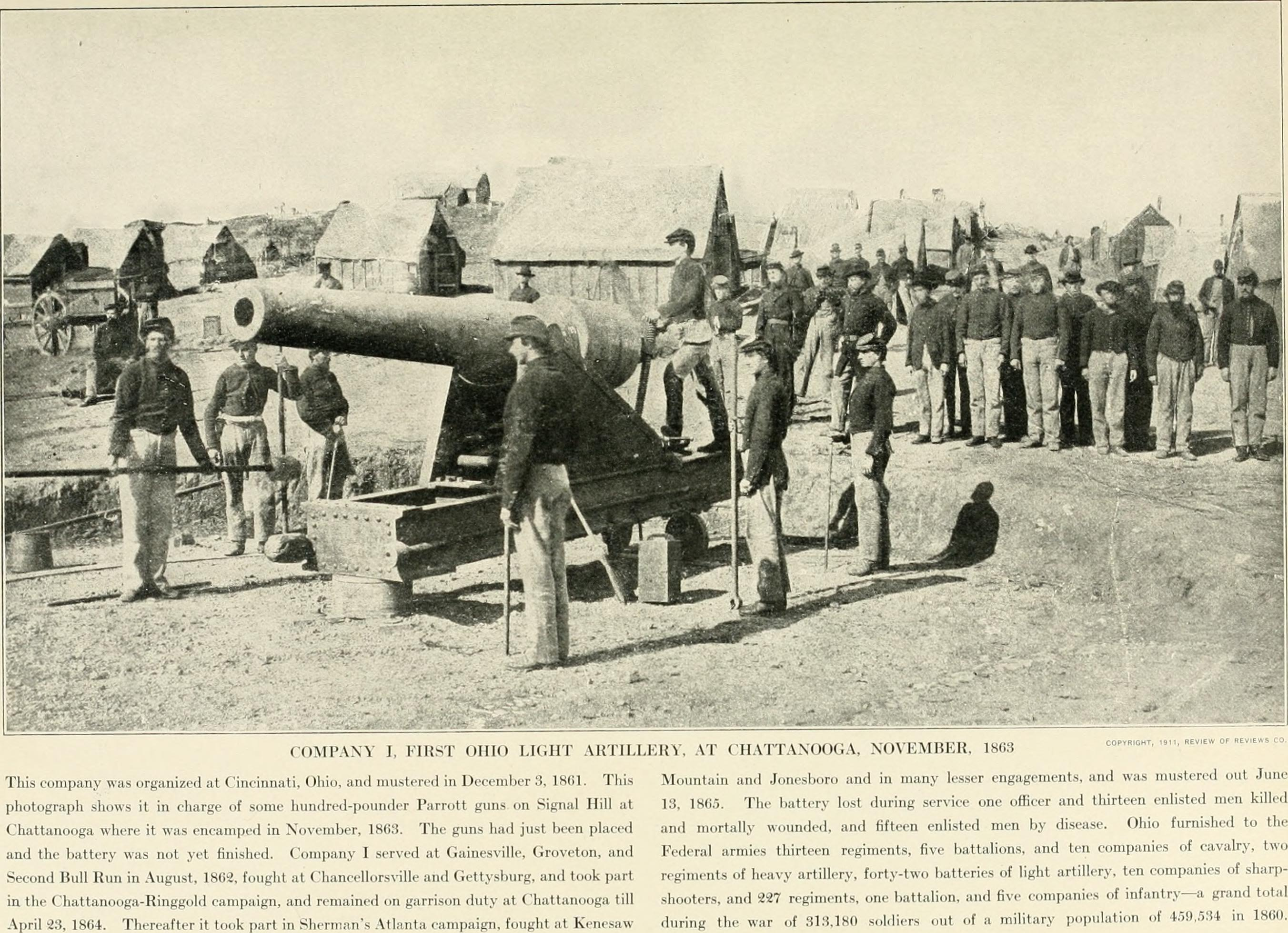
- Dilger's men with Parrott 100-pounder in Chattanooga, November 1863
- Active: December 3, 1861 to June 13, 1865
- Country: United States
- Allegiance: Union
- Branch: Artillery
- Engagements: Second Battle of Bull Run; Battle of Chancellorsville; Battle of Gettysburg; Battle of Wauhatchie; Battle of Missionary Ridge; Atlanta campaign Battle of Resaca; Battle of Dallas; Battle of New Hope Church; Battle of Allatoona; Battle of Kennesaw Mountain; Battle of Peachtree Creek; Siege of Atlanta; Battle of Jonesboro

Battery I, 1st Ohio Light Artillery was an artillery battery that served in the Union Army during the American Civil War. It was also known as Dilger's Battery.

== Service ==
The battery was organized in Cincinnati, Ohio and mustered in for a three-year enlistment on December 3, 1861 under Captain Hubert Dilger. The regiment was organized as early as 1860 under Ohio's militia laws, under Colonel James Barnett.

The battery was attached to Milroy's Command, Cheat Mountain District, Virginia, to April 1862. Milroy's Independent Brigade, Department of the Mountains, to June 1862. Unattached, 3rd Division, I Corps, Pope's Army of Virginia, to September 1862. Artillery, 3rd Division, XI Corps, Army of the Potomac, to May 1863. Artillery Brigade, XI Corps, Army of the Potomac, to September 1863, and Army of the Cumberland to November 1863. Artillery, 2nd Division, IV Corps, Army of the Cumberland, to December 1863. Garrison Artillery, Chattanooga, Tennessee, Department of the Cumberland, to April 1864. Artillery, 1st Division, XIV Corps, Army of the Cumberland, to July 1864. Artillery Brigade, XIV Corps, to September 1864. Garrison Artillery, Chattanooga, Tennessee, to March 1865. 2nd Separate Division, District of the Etowah, Department of the Cumberland, to July 1865.

Battery I, 1st Ohio Light Artillery mustered out of service on June 13, 1865.

=== Detailed service ===
Battery I's detailed service is as follows:

==== 1861 ====
- Engaged in guarding the fortifications and approaches to Cincinnati in back of Newport, Ky., Mt. Adams and Price's Hill October–December 1861.

==== 1862 ====
- Left Cincinnati for Parkersburg, Va., January 26, 1862, then moved to New Creek February 3.
- Expedition to Moorefield, Va., February 11–16, 1862.
- Action at Moorefield February 12.
- Moved to Clarksburg, Va., then to Beverly March 26.
- Joined Milrow at Monterey, Dinwiddle Gap, April 25.
- Shenandoah Mountain May 7.
- McDowell May 8.
- Franklin May 26.
- Strasburg June 1.
- Harrisonburg June 6.
- Cross Keys June 8.
- Port Republic June 9.
- Luray June 10.
- At Middletown until July 7, and at Luray until August.
- Pope's Campaign in northern Virginia August 16-September 2.
- Fords of the Rappahannock August 21–23.
- Freeman's Ford and Hazel Run August 22.
- Battles of Gainesville August 28.
- Groveton August 29.
- Bull Run August 30.
- Duty in the defenses of Washington and at Fairfax Court House until December. Manassas Gap November 5–6.
- March to Fredericksburg, Va., December 10–16.

==== 1863 ====
- Burnside's 2nd Campaign ("Mud March") January 20–24, 1863.
- Chancellorsville Campaign April 27-May 6.
- Battle of Chancellorsville May 1–5.
- Gettysburg Campaign June 11-July 24.
- Battle of Gettysburg July 1–3.
- On line of the Rappahannock until September.
- Movement to Bridgeport, Ala., September 24-October 3.
- Reopening Tennessee River October 26–29.
- Battle of Wauhatchie, Tenn., October 28–29.
- Chattanooga-Ringgold Campaign November 23–27.
- Orchard Knob November 23.
- Missionary Ridge November 24–25.
- Garrison duty at Chattanooga until April 23, 1864.

==== 1864 ====
- Atlanta Campaign May 1 to September 8, 1864.
- Demonstrations on Rocky Faced Ridge May 8–11.
- Buzzard's Roost Gap May 8–9.
- Battle of Resaca May 14–15.
- Advance on Dallas May 18–25.
- Operations on line of Pumpkin Vine Creek and battles about Dallas, New Hope Church and Allatoona Hills May 25-June 5.
- Pickett's Mills May 27.
- Operations about Marietta and against Kennesaw Mountain June 10-July 2.
- Pine Hill June 11–14. Lost Mountain June 15–17.
- Assault on Kennesaw June 27;
- Ruff's Station, Smyrna Camp Ground, July 4;
- Chattahoochee River July 5–17;
- Peachtree Creek July 19–20.
- Siege of Atlanta July 22-August 25.
- Utoy Creek August 5–7.
- Flank movement on Jonesboro August 25–30.
- Battle of Jonesboro August 31-September 1.
- Ordered to Chattanooga, Tenn., September, and garrison duty there.

==== 1865 ====
- Garrison duty at Chattanooga, Tenn., until June 1865.

== Death of Polk ==
Battery I is credited with the death of Confederate Lt General Leonidas Polk on June 14, 1864 during the Atlanta campaign. The battery fired three rounds at a cluster of Confederate Generals on Pine Top including Joseph E. Johnston and William Hardee. Johnston and Hardee escaped but the 3rd shell struck Polk in the left side removing his arm and part of his torso killing the bishop/general immediately.

== Casualties ==
The battery lost a total of 29 men during service; 1 officer and 13 enlisted men killed or mortally wounded, 15 enlisted men died of disease.

== Commanders ==
- Captain Hubert Dilger

== Notable members ==
- Captain Hubert Dilger – Medal of Honor recipient for action at the Battle of Chancellorsville

== See also ==
- List of Ohio Civil War units
- Ohio in the Civil War
