= 74th Pennsylvania Infantry Regiment =

74th Pennsylvania Volunteer Infantry "German Regiment"
- Pennsylvanian State Flag
- Active: September 14, 1861 until August 29, 1865
- Country: United States
- Allegiance: Union
- Branch: Infantry
- Engagements: American Civil War; Battle of Cross Keys; Freeman's Ford; Sulphur Springs; Waterloo Bridge; Groveton; Second Battle of Bull Run; Battle of Chancellorsville; Battle of Gettysburg; Battle of Seabrook Island; Battle of John's Island; First Battle of James Island

The 74th Pennsylvania Volunteer Infantry was an infantry regiment which served in the Union Army during the American Civil War. It was one of many all-German regiments in the army, most notably in the XI Corps of the Army of the Potomac. Its combat record was marred by the perceived poor performance of the entire corps at Chancellorsville and Gettysburg, when parts of the corps routed during Confederate attacks.

== Organization ==
During the months of August and September 1861, the volunteer regiment was primarily enlisted from recent German immigrants and their descendants. It was officially mustered into service in mid-September as the 35th Pennsylvania Infantry Regiment at Camp Wilkens, near Pittsburgh. On September 22, the 35th was posted to Washington, D.C. However, due to internal intrigue arising while its first colonel, Alexander Schimmelfennig, was ill, it was to lose that designation, and its men were in a state of limbo until Pittsburgh and Philadelphia interests convinced the U.S. War Department to reinstate the colonel. The regiment was then redesignated as the 74th Pennsylvania Volunteer Infantry Regiment, but its men and its communities knew it as "The German Regiment" or the "1st German Regiment."

The companies were from the following counties:
Company A Columbia and Wyoming Counties
Company B Pittsburgh
Company C Northumberland County
Company D Snyder and Union Counties
Company E Northumberland County
Company F Indiana and Westmoreland Counties
Company G Adams and Berks Counties - same company under Captain Krauseneck (see later). It was one of the most diverse companies including one Irishman, one Austrian, four Swiss, eight Alsatians, 10 Bavarians, 14 Badeners (another German state) and 15 Wurttembergers (another German state).
Company H Unknown
Company I Pittsburgh
Company K Allegheny and Philadelphia Counties

== Early service - 1862 ==
The 74th Infantry received its colors on March 5, 1862, while encamped near the nation's capital. Representative Robert McKnight made the presentation. The regiment was part of the "mud march" in Virginia's Shenandoah Valley in the spring of 1862 in the effort to confront General Stonewall Jackson.

Its first significant battle was at Cross Keys. The 74th was on the far left of the Union line, where it was engaged in a heated battle in the latter part of the day. Six men were killed and another thirteen were wounded. Its second battle was at Freeman's Ford, when Schimmelfennig advanced the regiment into the rear column of the Confederate forces. The enemy turned its full force on the regiment forced the 74th to retreat. 12 men were killed, 37 were wounded, and 3 drowned trying to cross the river and get back within Union lines. An additional 16 men were missing. It was here that Brig. Gen. Henry Bohlen was killed. Colonel Schimmelfennig was eventually promoted to take his place.

In the following days, the regiment participated in the battles of Sulphur Springs and Waterloo Bridge before joining the Army of the Potomac for the Northern Virginia Campaign. It participated in heated fighting at Second Bull Run. When the regiment returned to the Washington D.C. area, its command changed. Maj. Adolph von Hartung was promoted to colonel and commander of the regiment, which was stationed near Stafford Court House. There, some of its men who took ill were treated at the XI Corps Reserve Hospital in Fairfax, Virginia. (Today this historic building, complete with Union soldier graffiti on the walls, is known as Blenheim House. Four members of the 74th wrote on the walls of this house.)

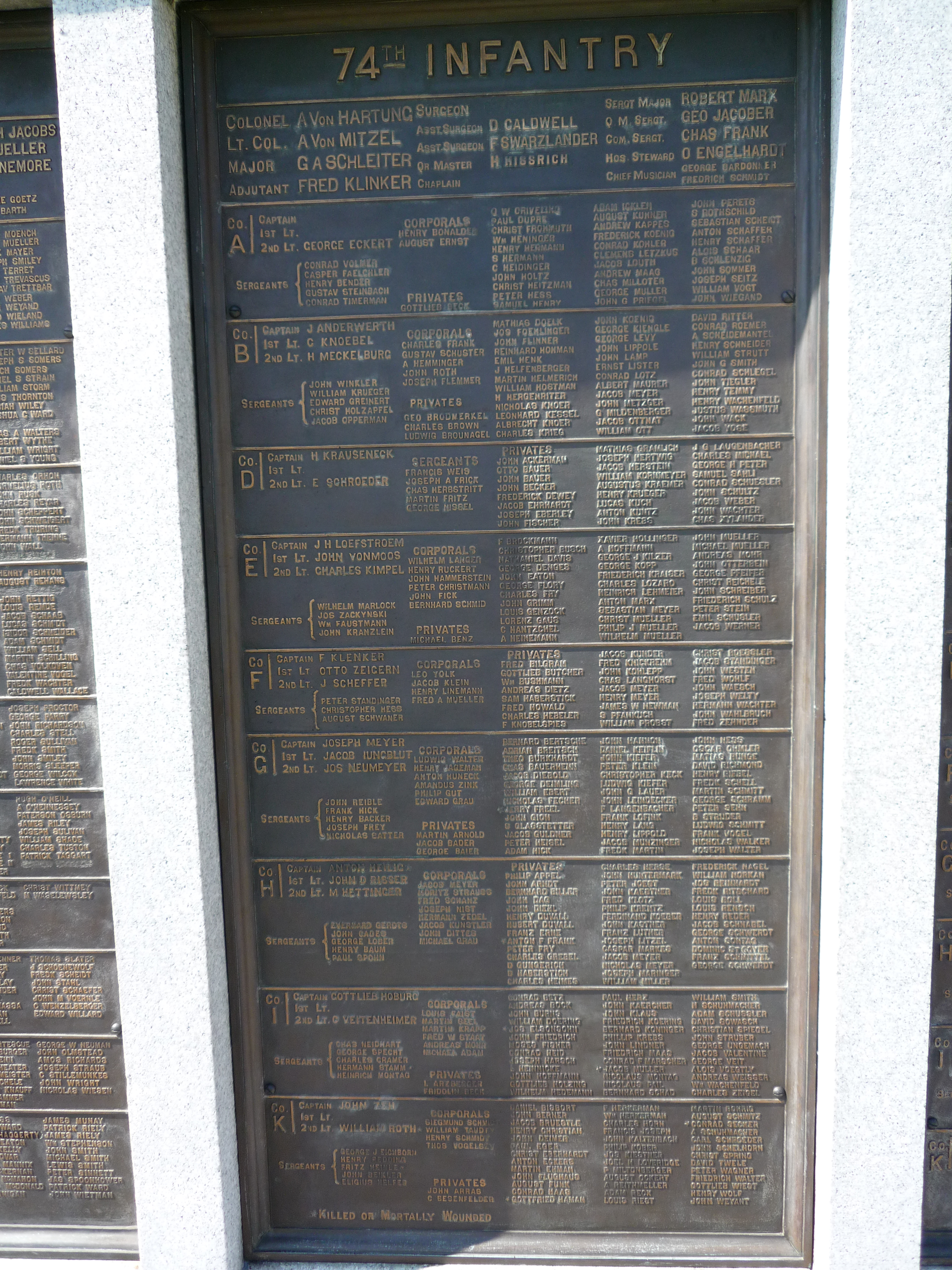
74th PA Infantry tablet at Gettysburg, PA

== 1863 service ==
During the early stages of the Battle of Chancellorsville in May, the 74th was among the XI Corps troops that were surprised in camp by the furious flank attack of Jackson's Corps. Another retreat occurred at Gettysburg, where the regiment was pushed through the streets to Cemetery Hill when the brigade retired. Of 381 officers and men, the 74th lost 10 killed, 40 wounded, 60 captured or missing.

With the rest of Schimmelfennig's depleted brigade, soon after Gettysburg, the 74th was permanently transferred from the Army of the Potomac to South Carolina, where it saw action in several fights in the swamplands during operations to take Charleston.

== Battle of Gettysburg ==
The 74th Pennsylvanian Volunteer Regiment saw its most notable battle at Gettysburg where it would lose most of its men, be routed, and have a commander found guilty of cowardice.

On the first day of the battle, the regiment was deployed to the front lines and fought until 2 p.m.. The then Colonel of the Regiment, Colonel Adolph von Hartung, who was also a former Prussian Army officer, was wounded the first day. Command of the regiment fell to Lieutenant Colonel Alexander Theobald von Mitzel. The Lieutenant Colonel would be captured by the Confederates during the retreat through the town. When the regiment reorganized itself, command was taken up by Captain Henry Krauseneck. The XI Corps would later fall back and the regiment would no longer see any fighting. Instead, the regiment would stand in line for the next two days positioned in front of the cemetery.

On a day in January 1864, Captain Krauseneck would later be called to trial for cowardice conduct at Gettysburg, he was found guilty and was permitted to resign.

== Final service ==
In its final months of service, the regiment guarded the Parkersburg branch of the Baltimore & Ohio Railroad in West Virginia

The 74th Pennsylvania Infantry Regiment mustered out at Clarksburg, West Virginia, on August 29, 1865. The soldiers returned to Pittsburgh, Pennsylvania, where they were discharged.

== Casualties ==
- Killed and mortally wounded: 2 officers, 39 enlisted men
- Died of wounds: 0 officers, 19 enlisted men
- Died of disease or other factors: 1 officer, 71 enlisted men
- Wounded: 9 officers, 129 enlisted men
- Captured or missing: 4 officers, 128 enlisted men
- Total losses: 16 officers, 386 enlisted men

== Honors ==
A monument commemorating the regiment is located in Gettysburg, Pennsylvania. It was first raised July 2, 1888 made out of granite standing seven and a half feet high. In 2003, a driver badly damaged the monument, but it was restored.

It still stands today.

== See also ==
- List of Pennsylvania Civil War Units
