= Fife and drum corps =

Military musical ensemble

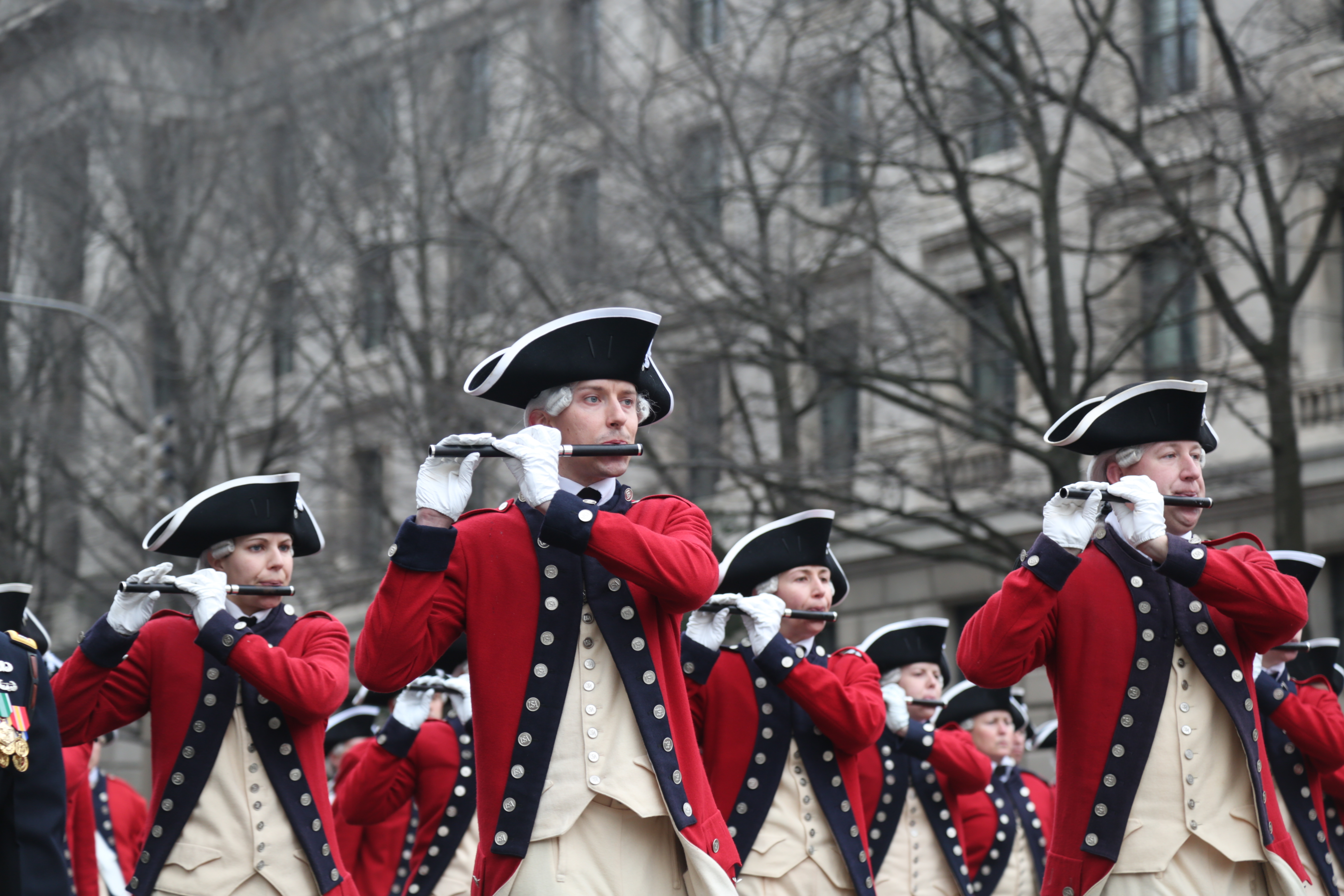
The Old Guard Fife and Drum Corps.

A fife and drum corps is a musical ensemble consisting of a fife, a snare drum and a bass drum. In the United States of America, fife and drum corps specializing in colonial period impressions using a fife, a snare drum and a bass drum are known as Ancient Fife and Drum Corps. Many of these ensembles originated from a type of military field music.

== History ==
The Roast Beef of Old England
A fife and drum rendition of "The Roast Beef of Old England" (1731), which both the Royal Navy and the United States Marine Corps use at dinner time.

Fifes are an ancient wind instrument that have evolved over the centuries. The original form was small and bore six finger-holes, but later versions may have various sizes and numbers of holes. While ancient fifes were one-piece and therefor not easily tuned, modern fifes are two pieces connected by a joint made from either metal or cork. Modern 10-hole and 11-hole fifes are chromatic, thus able to play any note as opposed to the more limited ancient fifes, which could only be played in a few keys.

The fife originated in Europe and has spread widely beyond. It is a similar instrument to the German Schweizerpfeife, which translates to a tin whistle.

Fifes have been in use by military organizations since the 16th century. Fifes originally accompanied companies of soldiers, providing music while on the march and in camp. Drums have had a role in militaries going back farther in history.

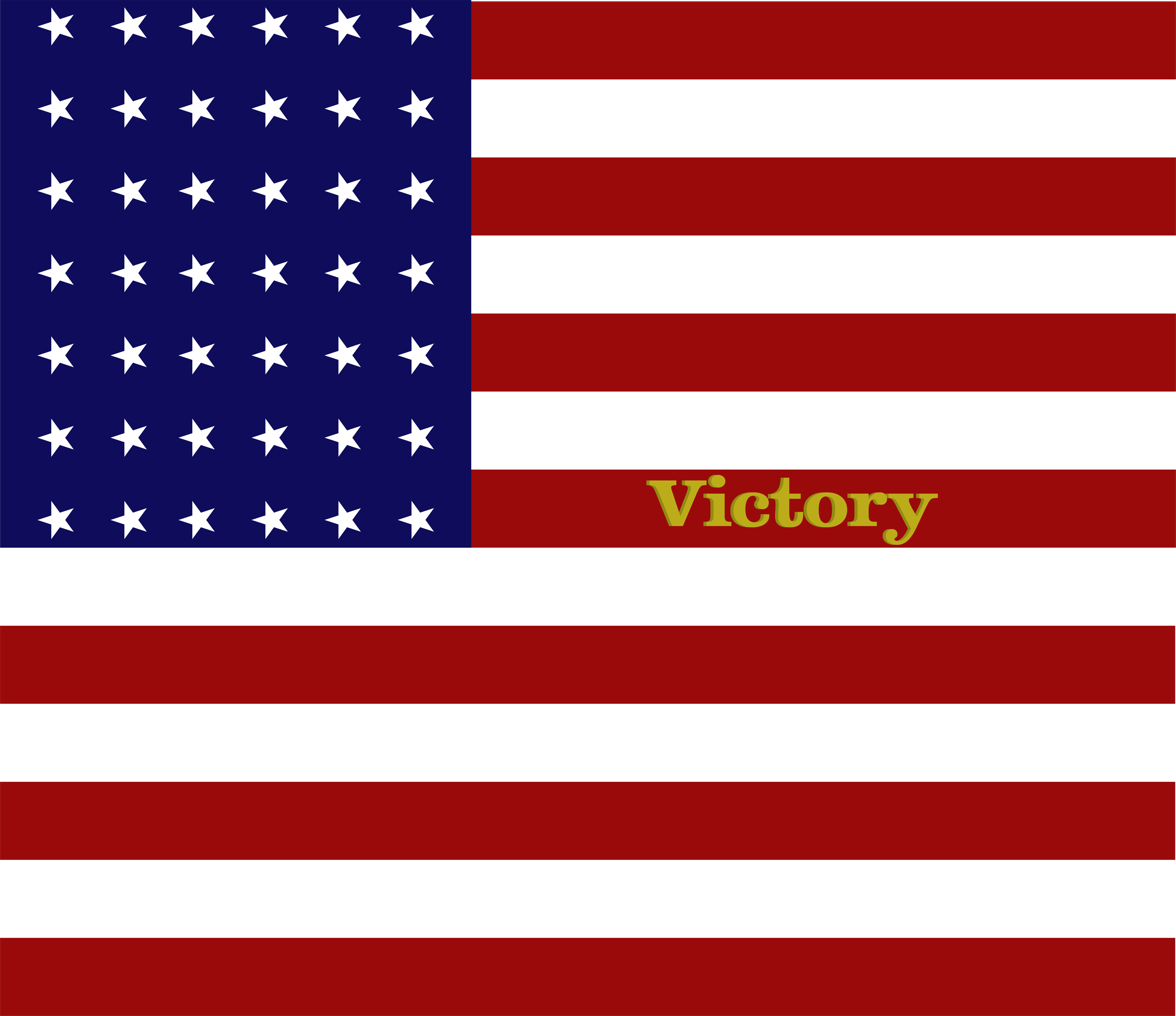
Digital reconstruction of the United States Drum Corps flag, 1889

The rise of the modern army began in the late 16th century and evolved throughout the 18th century. Drilling to precise and increasingly complicated geometric movements in close order formation, armies adapted and trained fifers and drummers to signal preparatory alerts and execution signals as well as times of day for the troops. It became customary for each company of 100 or so men to be assigned a fifer, a snare drummer and a bass drummer to sound signals, hours and alarms, as well as play popular music on the march. This pattern was also practised in the U.S. services from the Revolutionary War up until the late 19th Century. When the companies of a Regiment or Battalion were gathered together, it was customary to assemble the fifes and drums from all the companies into a 'band' to march at the head of the column on parade. When a regimental military band (woodwinds and brass) were also present, the fifes and drums marched at the head, followed by the military band. This is still the custom with British Regimental bands. To this day, the drum major's preparatory command to move a British Army band is, "Band and Drums...". This is referring back to the segregation of the fifes and drums as a separate entity from a military band.

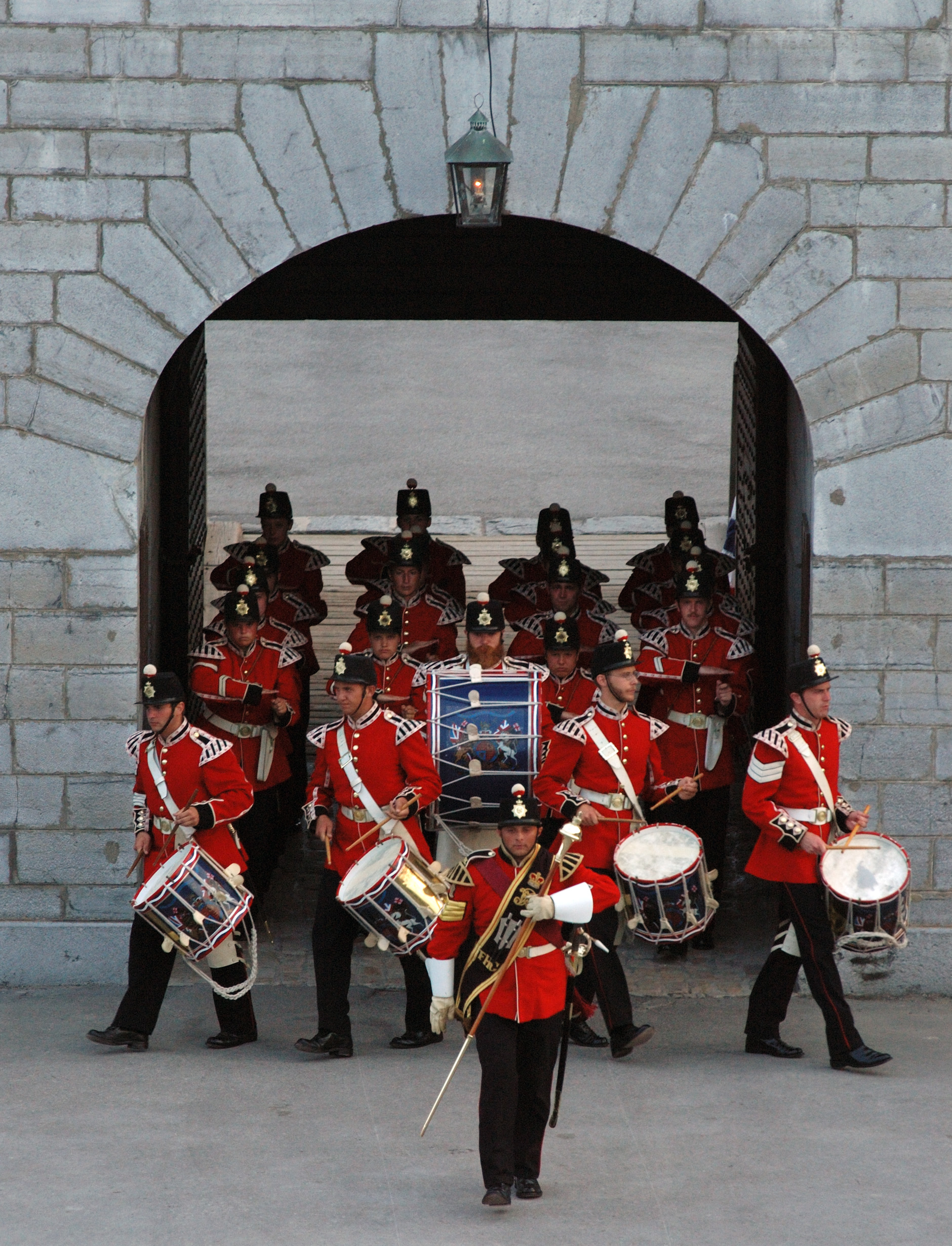
The Fort Henry Guard Fife and Drum Corps.

Fifes have always been an infantry musical instrument. Assigned at the company level with a fife and 2 drums (snare and bass) per company (or formed as a band at the regimental level), fifes and drums were used to regulate the daily activities of the troops. They signaled when the troops should rise in the morning and retire at night, when to eat, when to assemble, and to sound an alarm. The infantry used side drums (snare and bass drums). When detached to the companies, the drummers used only the side drums. Cavalry and Dragoon (mounted infantry) units did not use them, instead utilizing bugles to signal commands. The only remaining Fife and Drum Corps in the American Military is the Fife and Drum Corps of the 3rd U.S. Infantry Regiment (The Old Guard), a ceremonial Army unit based out of Ft. Myer, Virginia, raised in 1960.

The Colonial Williamsburg Fifes and Drums, founded in 1958 by the Colonial Williamsburg Foundation, is a professional corps made up of young musicians between the ages of 10 and 18. They are a fine representation of what a fife and drum corps would have looked and sounded like during the mid-eighteenth century when company fifers and drummers came together as a single unit for marches, trooping of the colors, and parades. The Colonial Williamsburg Fifes and Drums depict the Virginia State Garrison Regiment, which served in the Tidewater area of Virginia shortly after the American Revolution.

Modern non-military Fife and Drum Corps are organizations with volunteer or paid performers. Revenue is obtained through fundraising and by performing in town and city parades. Corps performance pieces often reflect the expectations of the audience for these venues (e.g., American, Holiday and Celtic medleys for Memorial Day, Independence Day, Labor Day, Veterans Day, Thanksgiving, Christmas, Presidents Day and St. Patrick's Day, respectively). Sometimes a Fire Department may have their own associated Fife and Drum Corps to march ahead of their fire trucks. Other corps may obtain revenue from reenactment performances. Several times per year various Fife and Drum Corps meet to compete, parade, socialize, and muster at a camp ground or meeting hall (in the winter).

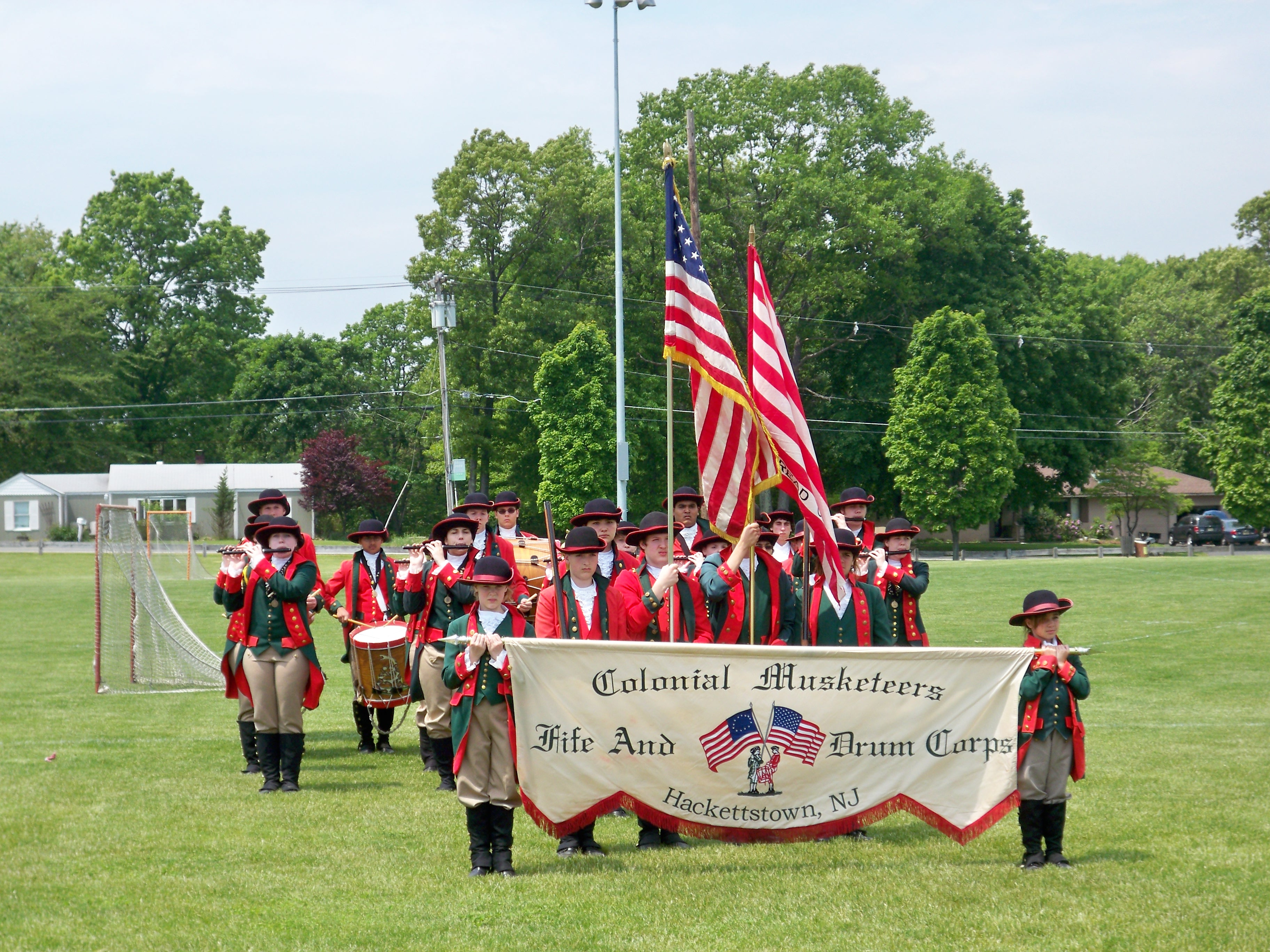
Colonial Musketeers, Youth Fife and Drum Corps from Hackettstown, New Jersey

The Marine Corps of the Royal Netherlands Navy employs a Fife and Drum Corps tracing back its roots to 1665 and possibly earlier. In Dutch, the Tamboers en Pijpers are made up of fully trained professional Dutch Marines who play the drums (Tamboer) or fife (Pijper, derived from Pfeife, cognate of Fife). Both categories are fully accomplished as Buglers for Dutch military ceremonial tasks.

== Instrumentation ==
A fife is a woodwind instrument in the transverse flute and piccolo family, which sounds an octave above the written music and has 6 tone holes (some have 10 or 11 tone holes for added chromatics). Most fifes are wood - blackwood, grenadilla, rosewood, mopane, pink-ivory and other dense woods are superior; maple and persimmon are inferior, but often used, particularly as entry-level instruments. Some corps have used metal fifes. In Civil War corps, bugles are sometimes part of the instrumentation.

Rope-tension snare and bass drums are tightened using tugs or ears that apply pressure to the rope, which is transferred to the heads when the rope compresses the counter hoops, causing them to move slightly closer together. The drum heads used are usually made of calf skin, or plastic drum heads made by many drum manufacturers. Unlike in the British corps, the single tenor drum is not customarily used in American fife and drum ensembles, although only a few ensembles that play the fife and bugle have them and these were paired in the 1880s in the US Armed Forces with fifes and bugles when these were introduced before the fifes were abandoned.

== Performance ==
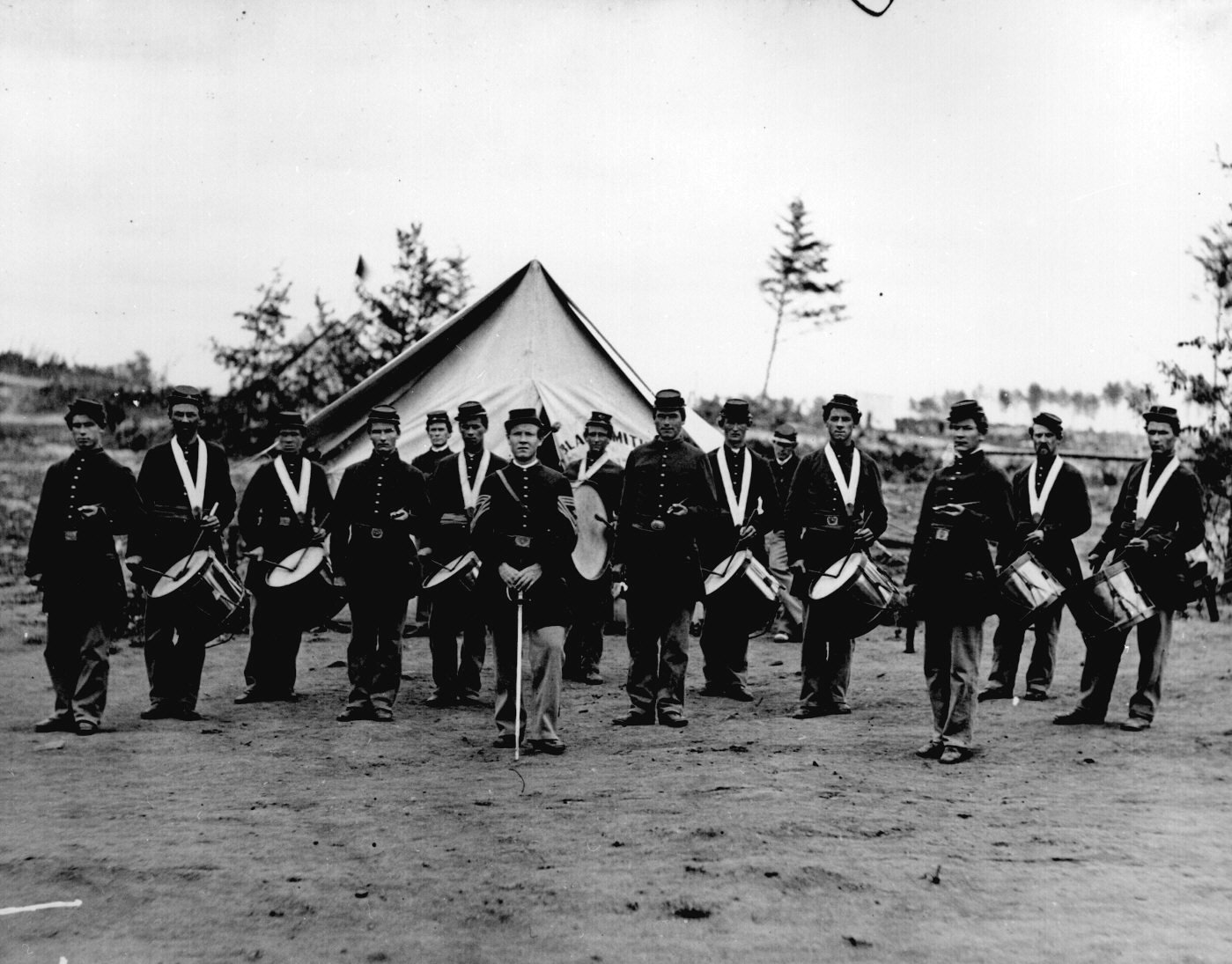
A fife and drum corps from the American Civil War.

The drums are beaten using two sticks. Visual effects may be created by flourishes of the drum sticks; for example, bass drummers may swing the beaters in a flourish like a bodhran while the snare drummers roll like a tambourine.

Songs are chosen based on a number of criteria, and can include both historically significant music and new pieces specifically composed or arranged to be played on fife and drum.

Most fife and drum corps march in parades, perform at concerts, in festivals and state fairs, and expositions. Some fife and drum corps focus on interpreting a specific time period and portray field musicians of the era at living history events and reenactments. Many corps perform together at musters, particularly in the North-East, but also nationally throughout the United States.

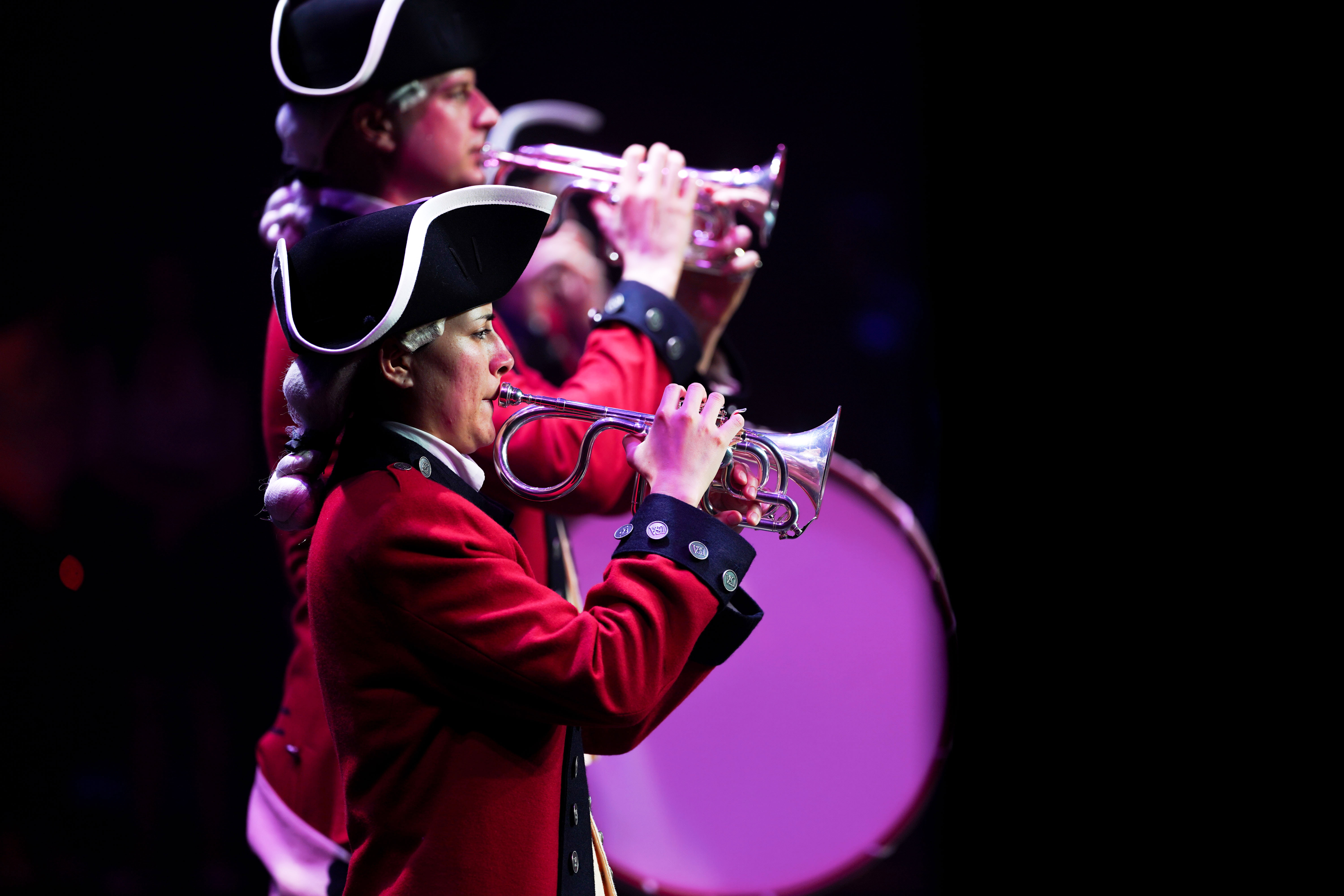
Members of the U.S. Army Old Guard's Fife and Drum Corps (March 29, 2025)

The typical uniform of the Ancient Fife and Drum Corps is a representation of some military uniform from the American Revolutionary War. Uniforms often consist of tricorns or cocked hats, waistcoats, knickers (knee breeches) or gaitered trousers, ruffled cuffs, neck stocks, and buckled shoes similar those by the Continental Army or Marines. Only a few wear uniforms of the War of 1812, including shakos. More recently, American Civil War uniforms have risen in prominence, with uniforms and instrumentation based on Civil War units of either the Union or Confederate armies. Headdress worn by these is either the kepi or Forage cap.

== Repertoire ==
- Aida
- All I Want for Christmas Is My Two Front Teeth
- Amazing Grace
- America The Beautiful
- The Army Goes Rolling Along
- Battle Hymn of the Republic
- Blackberry Blossom
- Blow the Man Down
- Bluebells of Scotland
- The Bonnie Blue Flag
- Scots Wha Hae
- Camptown Races
- Carmen
- Chicken Reel
- Chim Chim Cher-ee
- Columbia, the Gem of the Ocean
- Comin' Thro' the Rye
- Dashing White Sergeant
- Deck the Halls
- Drunken Sailor
- Flowers of Edinburgh
- The Girl I Left Behind
- My Grandfather's Clock
- Grim Grinning Ghosts
- God Bless America
- Hail, Columbia
- Hail to the Chief
- Here Comes Santa Claus
- It's Beginning to Look a Lot Like Christmas
- It's a Small World
- I've Got a Dream
- I See the Light
- Jingle Bells
- Jingle Bell Rock
- Jolly Holiday
- Joy to the World
- Kingdom Coming
- Let's Go Fly a Kite
- Let It Snow! Let It Snow! Let It Snow!
- The Life I Lead
- Lillibullero
- Marching Through Georgia
- The Minstrel Boy
- Molly on the Shore
- My Country, 'Tis of Thee
- O Canada
- Oh! Susanna
- Old Dan Tucker
- Otello
- Pagliacci
- Parade of the Wooden Soldiers
- Rakes of Mallow
- Rockin' Around the Christmas Tree
- Rudolph, the Red-Nosed Reindeer
- Battle Cry of Freedom
- The Road to Boston
- Rule, Britannia!
- Sleigh Ride
- Scotland the Brave
- Silent Night
- Soarin'
- Supercalifragilisticexpialidocious
- The British Grenadiers
- The Hundred Pipers
- The Irish Washerwoman
- Marines' Hymn
- The Sailor's Hornpipe
- The Star-Spangled Banner
- Step in Time
- A Spoonful of Sugar
- The World Turned Upside Down
- Tramp! Tramp! Tramp!
- There's a Great Big Beautiful Tomorrow
- This Land Is Your Land
- Tosca
- Up on the Housetop
- (Underneath the) Lovely London Sky
- We Wish You a Merry Christmas
- When Johnny Comes Marching Home
- When This Cruel War Is Over
- When Will My Life Begin?
- White Christmas
- The Wind That Shakes the Barley
- Winter Wonderland
- Yankee Doodle
- The Yankee Doodle Boy
- Yo Ho (A Pirate's Life for Me)
- You're a Grand Old Flag
