= M. R. William Grebe =

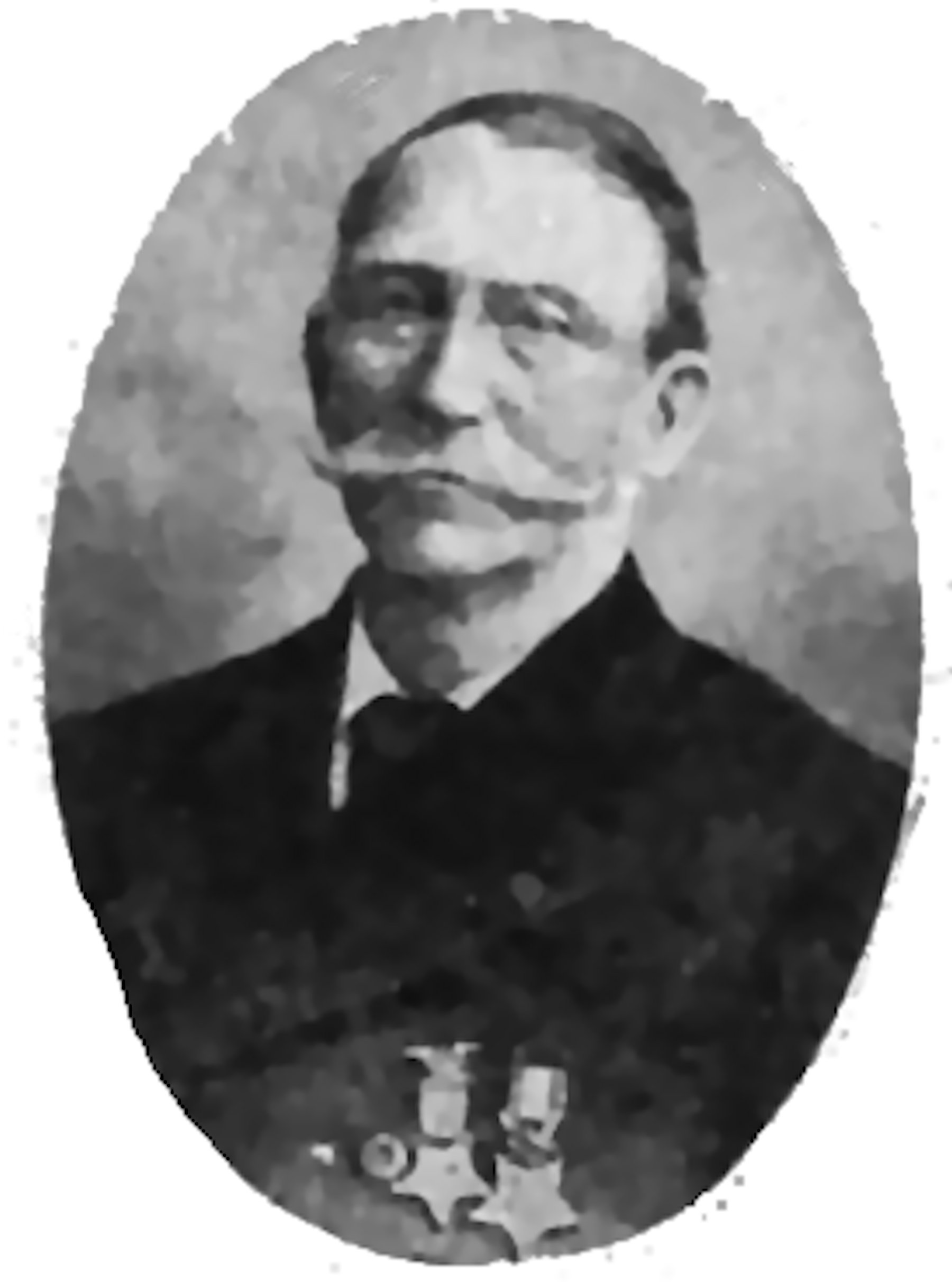
- William R. Grebe, circa 1913
- Born: August 4, 1838; Hildesheim, Lower Saxony
- Died: December 24, 1916 (aged 78)
- Burial place: Mount Saint Mary's Cemetery, Kansas City, Missouri
- Military career
- Allegiance: United States
- Branch: Union Army
- Rank: Captain
- Units: 4th Missouri Cavalry, Company F
- Awards: Medal of Honor

M. R. William Grebe (August 4, 1838 – December 24, 1916) was a military officer in the Union Army during the American Civil War.

Born in Germany, he was living in St. Louis, Missouri, at the outbreak of war, and enlisted in the 4th Missouri Cavalry and later attained the rank of Major. He was awarded the Medal of Honor for his actions in Jonesboro, Georgia, on August 31, 1864.

Grebe corresponded with and received letters back from Ulysses S. Grant and Theodore Roosevelt.

He died in Kansas in 1916.

== Medal of Honor citation ==
M. R. William Grebe received the Medal of Honor for his bravery during American Civil War. The citation issued February 24, 1899 reads:

The President of the United States of America, in the name of Congress, takes pleasure in presenting the Medal of Honor to Captain (Cavalry) M. R. William Grebe, United States Army, for extraordinary heroism on 31 August 1864, while serving with Company F, 4th Missouri Cavalry, in action at Jonesboro, Georgia. While acting as aide and carrying orders across a most dangerous part of the battlefield, being hindered by a Confederate advance, Captain Grebe seized a rifle, took a place in the ranks and was conspicuous in repulsing the enemy.
