= The Road to Boston =

"The Road to Boston" is a Revolutionary War marching song and was made the official Ceremonial March of Massachusetts in 1985. It is unknown who composed this march. It is sometimes known by the alternative name of "March to Boston". It has more recently been adapted to a fiddle tune, and remains popular to this day.
