= I Goes to Fight mit Sigel =

Song from the United States Civil War

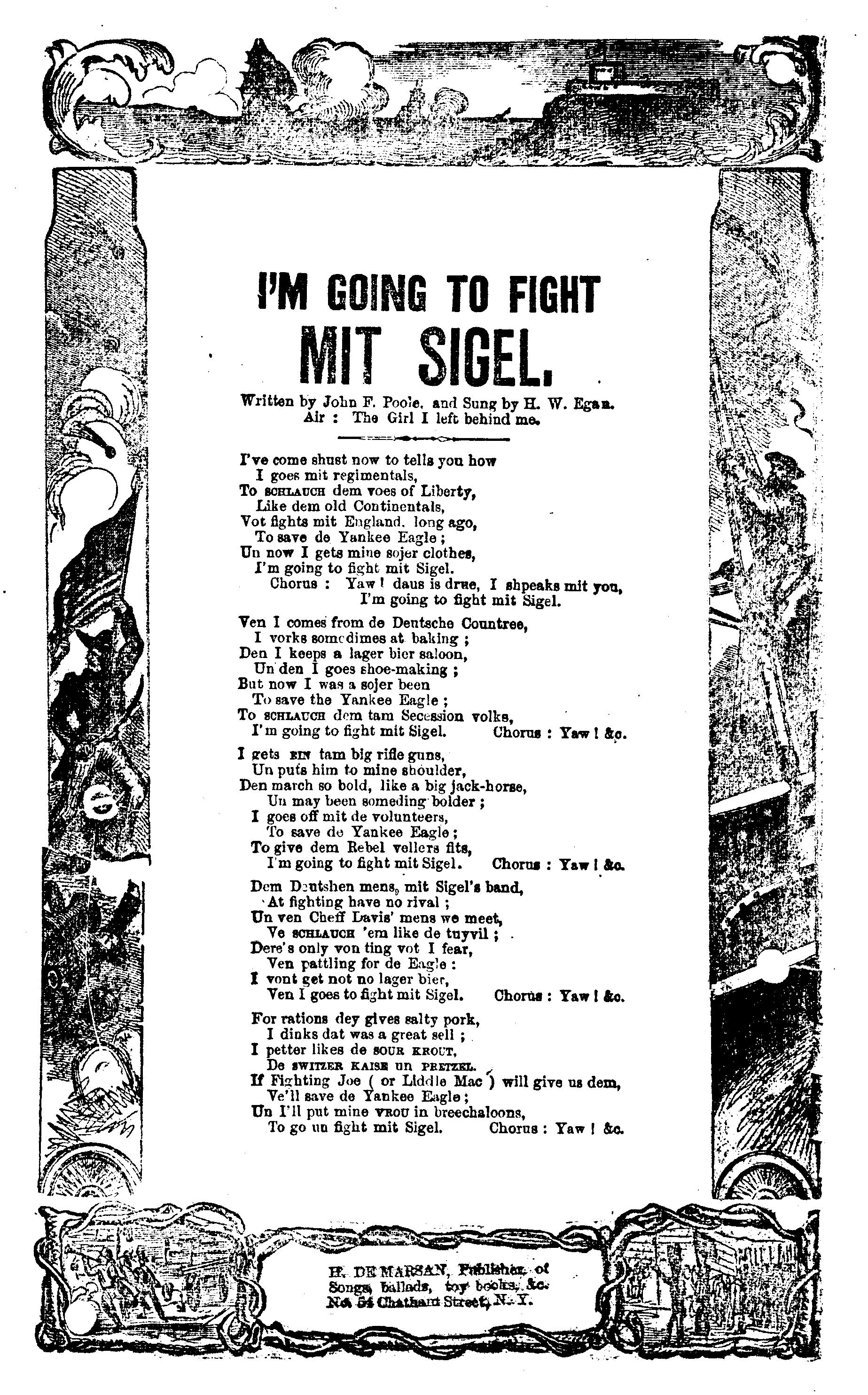

Song
- Published: 1863
- Lyricist: John F. Poole

I Goes to Fight mit Sigel (or I'm Going to Fight mit Sigel) is a song written during the American Civil War by John F. Poole and set to the tune of The Girl I Left Behind Me. The song is named for German-American major-general Franz Sigel and the lyrics parody the language and culture of German immigrant soldiers.

== History ==
Franz Sigel was a German commander from Baden. After immigrating to the United States, he was appointed to a brigadier-general position by Abraham Lincoln, serving from 1861 to 1864 with a generally poor military record. However, Sigel's popularity among German-Americans and German immigrants was generally unhampered by his poor military performance, as German-Americans generally preferred German leadership. Particularly during the early years of the Civil War, Sigel's German heritage was influential in attracting immigrant German volunteers. Many of these volunteers generally had no military experience and spoke very little English. The phrase "I fights mit Sigel" was a rallying cry for Germans expressing support for the Union, and a "passport" to join the Union army. The song was popular among minstrel impersonators after the Civil War.

== Lyrics ==
The song is generally considered to be a comic ethnic joke about German soldiers, but others consider the song to a genuine celebration of the loyalty of German soldiers under Sigel's command. The song's lyrics are written in English with elements of thickly accented German throughout:

I’ve come shusht now to tell you how
I goes mit regimentals,
To schlanck dem foes of liberty,
Like dem old continentals;
Vat fight mit England long ago,
To save the Yankee Eagle,
Un now I gits my solger clothes,
I’m going to fight mit Sigel,

(Chorus)
Yaw, das is true I speak mit you,
I’m going to fight mit Sigel.

The language, along with references to lager, sauerkraut, and pretzels, reinforce a stereotype of a "typical German-American". "Fighting Joe" in the final stanza of the song refers to General Joseph Hooker:

For rations dey gives salty pork,
I dinks dat was a great sell;
I petter likes der sauerkraut,
Der Schvitzer-kase und bretzel.
If Fighting Joe will give us dem,
Ve'll save der Yankee Eagle,
Und I'll put mine vrou in breech-a-loons
To go and fight mit Sigel

=== Confederate lyrics ===
A parody of the song was written by Confederate soldiers to mock Sigel's poor military performance and German immigrant soldiers:

Ven first I came from Lauterbach
I works sometimes by baking,
Un next I runs my beer saloon
Und den I try shoe-making
But now I march mit musket out
To save dot Yankee eagle
Dey dress me up in soldier clothes
To go and fight mit Sigel
