= August F. Bronner =

- Born: 1835; Germany
- Died: October 31, 1893 (aged 57–58); New Jersey
- Burial place: Fairmount Cemetery, Newark, New Jersey
- Military career
- Allegiance: United States of America
- Branch: United States Army
- Rank: Private
- Units: (New York (state)) Battery C, 1st Battalion, New York Volunteer Light Artillery
- Conflicts: Battle of White Oak Swamp; Battle of Malvern Hill
- Awards: Medal of Honor

Private August Frederick Bronner (1835 – October 31, 1893) was a German soldier who fought in the American Civil War. Bronner received the United States' highest award for bravery during combat, the Medal of Honor, for his action during the Battle of White Oak Swamp in Virginia and the Battle of Malvern Hill also in Virginia on June 30 and July 1, 1862.

== Biography ==
Bronner was born in Germany around 1835. He died on 31 October 1893. His remains are interred at the Fairmount Cemetery, Newark.

== Medal of Honor citation ==
Continued to fight after being severely wounded.

== See also ==
- List of American Civil War Medal of Honor recipients: A–F
