= Charles Blucher =

German soldier who fought in the American Civil War

- Born: Germany
- Military career
- Allegiance: United States of America
- Branch: United States Army
- Service years: 1863 - 1865
- Rank: Sergeant
- Unit: 188th Regiment Pennsylvania Volunteer Infantry - Company H
- Conflicts: Battle of Chaffin's Farm
- Awards: Medal of Honor

Sergeant Charles Blucher was a German soldier who fought in the American Civil War. Blucher received the United States' highest award for bravery during combat, the Medal of Honor, for his action during the Battle of Chaffin's Farm at Fort Harrison in Virginia on 29 September 1864. He was presented with the award on April 6, 1865.

Blucher joined the Army from Harrisburg, Pennsylvania in June 1863, and served as a color bearer in the 188th Pennsylvania Infantry. He was wounded at the Battle of Drewry's Bluff, and mustered out with his regiment in December 1865.

== Medal of Honor citation ==
Planted first national colors on the fortifications.

== See also ==
- List of American Civil War Medal of Honor recipients: A–F
