= Fife (instrument) =

Woodwind musical instrument

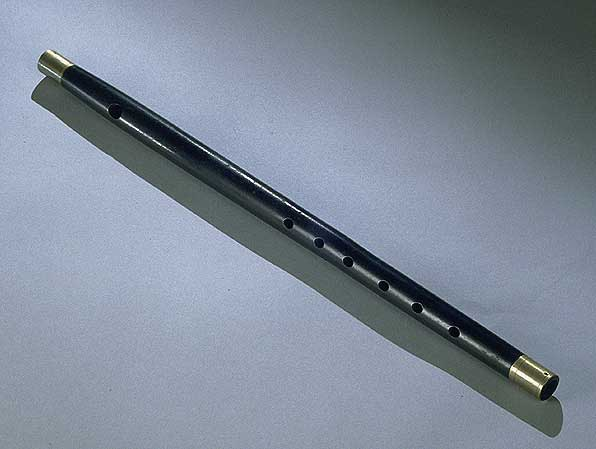
- Crosby-style fife made by George and Frederick Cloos

Woodwind instrument
- Classification: Wind; Woodwind; Aerophone; Edge-blown aerophone
- Hornbostel–Sachs classification: 421.121.12 (open side-blown flutes with fingerholes)

Playing range
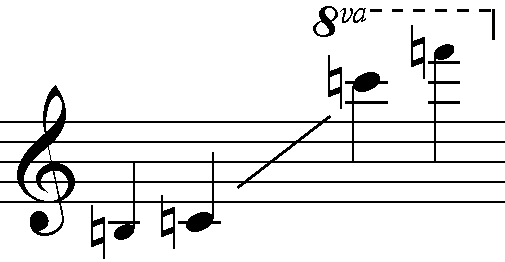
- (B3) C4–C7 (F7)

Related instruments
- Bansuri; Daegeum; Piccolo; Western concert flute

A fife (/faɪf/ FYFE) is a small, high-pitched, transverse aerophone, that is similar to the piccolo. The fife originated in medieval Europe and is often used in fife and drum corps, military units, and marching bands. Someone who plays the fife is called a fifer. The word fife comes from the German Pfeife, meaning pipe, which comes from the Latin word pipare.

The fife is a diatonically tuned instrument commonly consisting of a tube with six finger holes and an embouchure hole that produces sound when blown across. Modern versions of the fife are chromatic, having 10 or 11 finger holes that allow any note to be played. On a 10-hole fife, the index, middle, and ring fingers of both hands remain in the same positions as with the six-hole fife, while both thumbs and both pinkies are used to play accidentals. An 11-hole fife has holes positioned similarly, but adds a second hole under the right middle finger.

Fifes are made primarily of wood, such as blackwood, grenadilla, rosewood, mopane, pink ivory, cocobolo, boxwood, maple, or persimmon. Some fifes are entirely made of metal or plastic.

Military and marching fifes have metal reinforcing bands, called ferrules, around the ends to protect them from damage. A fife used in less strenuous conditions may have a lathe-turned, knob-like decoration at the ends for protection. Modern fifes may have two- or three-piece constructions, and may incorporate a sliding tuning joint made of metal or cork.

Fifes are most commonly used in fife and drum corps, but can also be found in folk music, particularly Celtic music. Some Caribbean music makes use of fifes, which are usually made from bamboo.

== Key and range ==
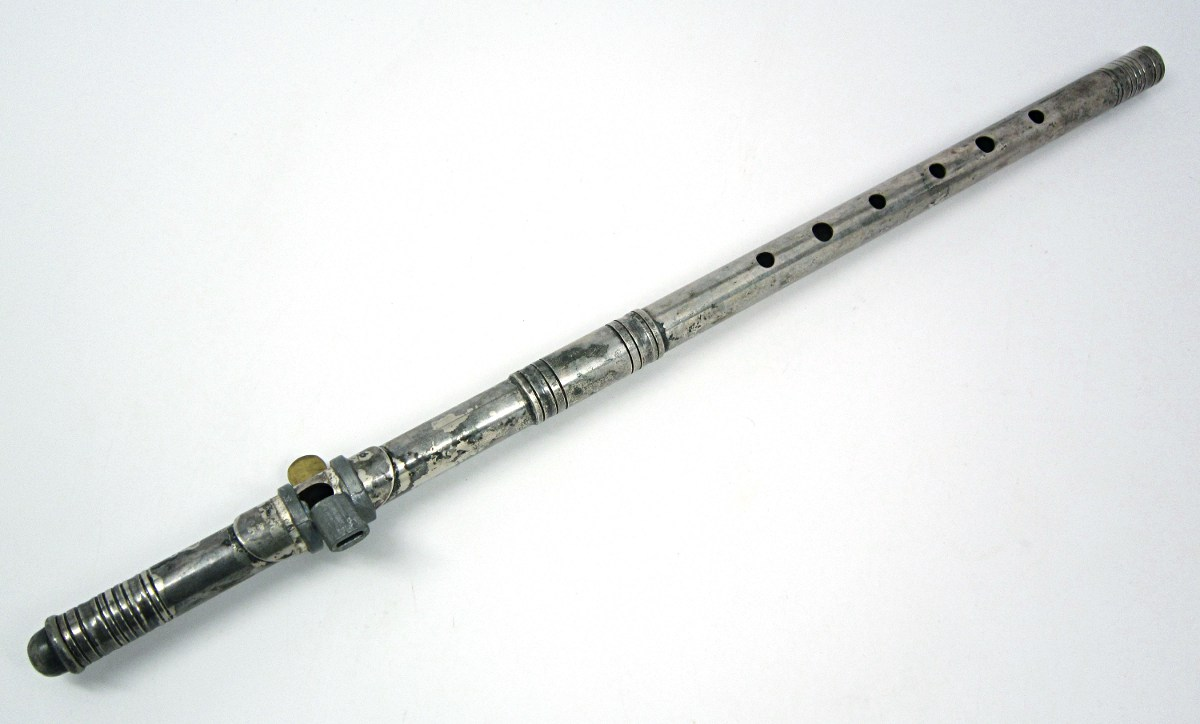
A fife with six finger holes and a lead "cheater" or fipple mouthpiece attached with a brass screw, c. 1850s.

The names of different varieties of fife follow the conventions of transposing instruments:

- defining the key in which a transposing instrument sounds as the major key whose tonic is either the lowest pitch producible by that instrument without fingering or other manipulation, or the pitch produced when the player fingers a C on the staff.
- naming different subtypes of a given transposing instrument after the respective keys in which those subtypes sound.

These conventions are specific to transposing instruments. By contrast, non-transposing instruments use another convention. For example, although the trombone and the tuba each produce a B♭ when played at their lowest harmonic position with the slide not extended or with no valves depressed, respectively, the trombone's music parts are not transposed, and the tuba's music parts are transposed only across octaves, such that the note sounded by a tuba bears the same name as the note read by the tubist.

- The standard "B♭" fife is an A♭ transposing instrument, meaning that prevailing scoring conventions dictate that the C position on a fife-part staff should correspond to a concert A♭. The standard fife sounds a minor sixth above written, the equivalent of a major-third drop followed by an octave increase. The B♭ name follows the same naming convention as with tin whistles, being named after the concert pitch produced with all six holes covered, or the instrument's D.
- Fifes pitched (i.e., constructed so as to sound) in the keys of D and of C are also common.
- Fifes in various other keys are sometimes played in musical ensembles.

A convention specific to some fife music and contradictory to the standard is for fife music to be written in the key of D regardless of the key in which the fife in question sounds. The general effect is to define sounded notes in terms of scale degree, as with a movable-do system, and then to express any pitch having a given scale degree in the context of a given musical piece, regardless of that pitch's absolute value, in terms of a staff position defined as corresponding to that scale degree. The more specific effect is to treat fife subtypes sounding in different keys as comparable to transposing-instrument subtypes (e.g., of clarinet) sounding in those keys except that the tonic of the key in which a given fife sounds is set as corresponding to D rather than C, such that the written key signature for fife music played in a given concert key would have two fewer sharps or two more flats than would the written key signature used in music written for other transposing-instrument subtypes sounding in the same key.

Like the Irish flute and the tin whistle, the ancient fife is a six-hole simple system flute. These flutes are unable to play all chromatic pitches, while many of the chromatic pitches which they can play are grossly out of tune. Because of these restrictions on available notes, the common six-hole fife is for practical purposes capable of playing only in the written keys of D (concert B♭) major, G (concert E♭) major, A (concert F) major, and those keys' relative minors.

An experienced fife player can play three full octaves, although the fingering patterns necessary for playing in the third octave can be daunting to a beginner. Marching bands typically play only in the second and third octave since these are the loudest and most penetrating.

== In folk music ==
In medieval Europe, the fife was used in some folk music traditions to accompany dancing by all social classes.

The fife was one of the most important musical instruments in the United States' Colonial period, even more widespread than the violin or piano. The fife can still be heard in some Appalachian folk music, playing lively dance tunes. American slaves adopted fifes in their musical traditions, which derived from African music. The tradition developed into fife and drum blues, a genre that continued throughout the 20th century but has since died out. One of the most famous artists in the tradition was Othar Turner, a musician from Mississippi, who played blues on homemade cane fifes.

There remains an active and enthusiastic group, primarily in the northeastern United States, that continues to play fife and drum music in a folk tradition that has gone on since the American Civil War. The center of this activity is in eastern Connecticut. There is a loose federation of corps, though not a governing body, called The Company of Fifers and Drummers, which maintains a headquarters and museum in Ivoryton, Connecticut.

Fife alone, or fife and drum, is also used in numerous European countries, especially in the South of France (Occitania): Languedoc and the county of Nice; in Switzerland (notably Basel); and in Northern Ireland, where it is often accompanied by the lambeg drum.

Modern players of Celtic music, folk music, old-timey music, and folk-rock include fifing in their arrangements of tunes and songs.

The Junkanoo festival of the Bahamas and Jamaica includes the music of bamboo fifes.

In the rural lands of northeast Brazil, people use a bamboo fife called a Brazilian fife (in Brazil it is called pife nordestino or just pife). This fife is a mix of Native American flute traditions with European fife traditions. The groups that use this instrument utilize only flute and percussive elements in their music, in a profusion of Native American, African and European traditions.

== In military music ==
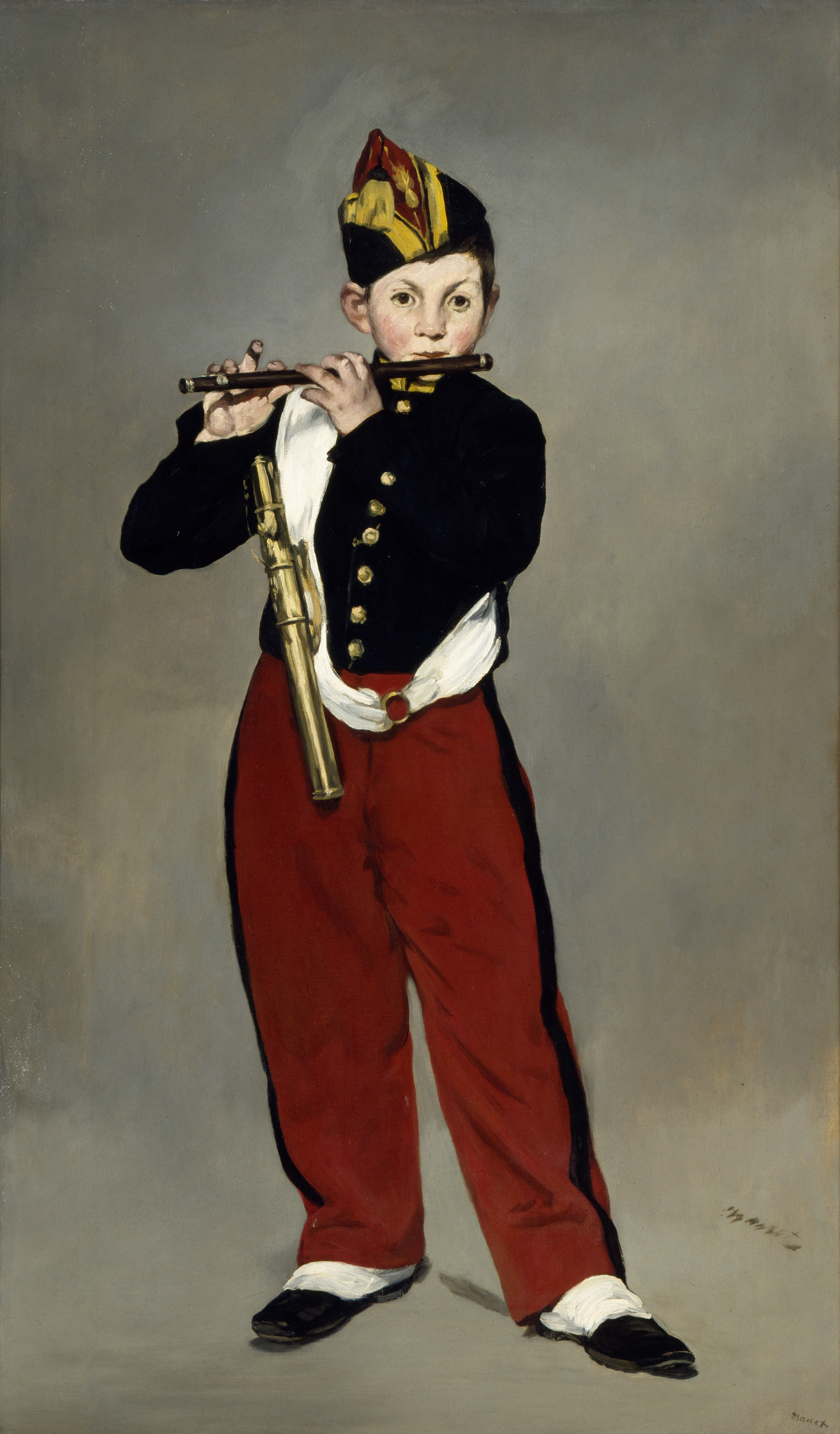
Édouard Manet, The Fifer, 1866. Musée d'Orsay, Paris.

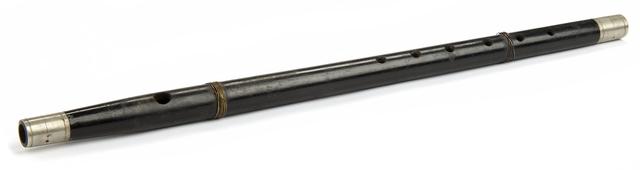
Fife made of black wood with 1 1/2" sterling silver end pieces. The fife was used by 3rd Minnesota Regiment during the Civil War. From the collection of the Minnesota Historical Society.

When played in its upper register, the fife is loud and piercing, yet also extremely small and portable. According to some reports, a band of fifes and drums can be heard up to 3 miles (4.8 km) away over artillery fire. Because of these qualities, European armies from the Renaissance on found it useful for signaling on the battlefield. Armies from Switzerland and southern Germany are known to have used the fife (German: Soldatenpfeife) as early as the 15th century. Swiss and German mercenaries were hired by monarchs throughout Western Europe, and they spread the practice of military fifing. The fife was a standard instrument in European infantries by the 16th century.

During the 17th and 18th centuries, the protocols of the fifes and drums became intricately associated with infantry regiments only. They were not used as signaling instruments by the cavalry or artillery, which used trumpets, kettle drums or both. Each company in an infantry regiment was assigned two fifers and two drummers. When the battalion (5 companies) or regiment (10 companies) was formed up on parade or for movement en masse, these musicians would be detached from the companies to form a "band". This is how the term band first came to refer to a group of musicians. In their individual companies, the signaling duties included orders to fire, retreat, advance, and so forth. By the 18th century, the military use of the fife was regulated by armies throughout Europe and its colonies. The rank of Fife Major was introduced, a noncommissioned officer responsible for the regiment's fifers, just as a Drum Major was responsible for the drummers. Books of military regulations included standard fife calls to be used in battle or at camp. During the American Revolutionary War, the British and Americans used the so-called Scotch and English Duties, specified melodies associated with various military duties. American martial music was influenced by that of the British military throughout the late 18th and early 19th centuries.

By the early 19th century, warfare was changing and fifes were no longer practical as combat signaling devices, being gradually replaced by the infantry bugle. They were still used as signaling (as opposed to musical) instruments by American units during the Civil War, but were gradually phased out by the 1880s (the same case in France). A similar evolution occurred in the British Army. The US Marines were the last American units to drop fifers from their rolls. However, the British have an unbroken tradition of using fife and drum corps attached to their infantry regiments, with whom they still parade regularly. Germany also continued an unbroken tradition of fife and drum corps until the end of World War II. They were integral to the regular German Army, Air Force and Navy, and not merely part of the Hitler Youth and the Nazi Party organizations. Bands of fifes and drums were regularly at the head of regimental parades and ceremonies of the infantry regiments, military schools and naval and air bases. The tradition of fifes and drums, though, even carried on in the Cold War, as both the West German Bundeswehr and the East German National People's Army formed dedicated sections.

Today the fife's military legacy can be seen in marching bands, for example in English, Welsh and Irish military units and in the pipes and drums of Scottish regiments. There are fife and drum corps in Switzerland, and the United States "Old Guard" has a ceremonial one. British fife and drum bands play at ceremonies such as the Trooping of the Colour. Amateur historical reenactment groups and dedicated civil bands sometimes feature fife and drum corps sporting period military costumes from the Revolutionary War, the War of 1812, the Mexican War or the American Civil War.

Military fife and drum bands can be heard in Germany, where they are part of the Bundeswehr. The Bundeswehr Staff Band Berlin and the Bundeswehr Band Bonn have fifes and drums assigned, as do the bands attached to the Bundeswehr Military Music Service in the German Army, German Navy and the Luftwaffe.

The Chilean Army and Chilean Navy have dedicated fife, drum and bugle bands attached to the main military bands. They are seen especially at the annual parades on May 21 and September 18 and 19. This tradition is now adopted by various Chilean elementary and secondary schools and colleges, both public and private, which frequently appear at public events.

The Russian Army places fifes and drums at the front of major military parades such as those on Red Square in Moscow as part of a dedicated formation. In Argentina, only the Tambor de Tacuari military band of the Regiment of Patricians has fifers, in accordance with an 1809 military regulation of the Viceroy of Buenos Aires, which allowed every militia unit in Buenos Aires to have a drummer and two fifers. The Spanish Royal Guard also has fifers, who wear the 18th–19th century uniforms of the Guardias de Corps, and the Spanish Army's 1st King's Immemorial Infantry Regiment of AHQ also has a dedicated fife and drum unit.

== Modern American manufacturers ==
The modern era of fifing in the United States began in about 1880, with the popularizing of civilian fife and drum corps in a musical tradition that has come to be known as Ancient fife and drum (or simply Ancient). The rise of these corps led to a demand for fifes that were superior in intonation and better suited for group playing than those used during the Civil War. This call was answered by the Cloos Company of Brooklyn, New York, and their Crosby Model fife. These fifes were one piece, cylindrical bore instruments with six irregularly sized and placed tone-holes. Compared to fifes made before this time, Cloos fifes were easier to play, better tuned, and produced a much louder sound.

After the death of Cloos Company founder George Cloos in 1910, the company continued to make fifes under the aegis of his son Frederick until it was bought out by Penzel-Mueller in 1946. Penzel-Mueller continued to make Cloos fifes for another six years after the buyout.

=== McDonagh ===
In 1958, a new model fife designed by fifer John McDonagh was manufactured in Germany. This model was used by the three corps affiliated with him: the New York Regimentals Fife and Drum Band, St. Benedict's Jr. Fife and Drum Corps, and St. Anselm's Jr. Fife and Drum Corps. All were located in the Bronx, New York. These fifes were not otherwise available to the public. In 1960, a second generation of model evolved, specifically labeled the McDonagh Model and made by Roy Seaman, a music repairman whom John met in Manhattan. This model quickly came into popularity. These fifes were mass-produced for sale to the entire fife and drum community. They were two-piece instruments with a dual conical bore – the foot joint tapered down from the joint to about an inch before terminus, where the bore cone reversed itself and opened up again slightly. They used the popular flute and piccolo designs of the 1830s, where "cone" flutes were popular and most common. The cone flutes had fallen out of favor to the cylindrical flutes designed by Boehm, though fifes and piccolos remained popular among folk music performers.

As would be expected, these fifes were notably more internally in tune than most previous fifes, since the designs of the 1830s fell from favor, and had the added value of being tunable with each other (by sliding the joint or the head cork). In addition, they gave the player greater dynamic control and could be played even louder than traditional fifes, the result of the lower cone in the bore. At first, only six hole (Model J) fifes were made, but by 1962, McDonagh designed and Seaman manufactured a 10-hole (Model L). Two of the holes were used by the right hand middle finger – covering only one of the two produced F♮. Some players found this quite difficult, so eventually (c. 1970s), an 11-hole model was introduced, the Model M, with both the original double right hand middle finger holes and a right hand thumb hole to choose from for the F♮. These were actually ideas derived from several makers of the days of the 19th century, including Giorgi, even though there was no need for F♮ in traditional fife music.

Around this time, Roy Seaman had been deeply involved in the making of piccolos under his name, the body style of which resembled the McDonagh Model fife. Roy retired from actively manufacturing fifes and sold the operation of making McDonagh fifes to an apprentice, Larry Trout. Operating on his own, Trout soon chose to mark the fife with his own fish symbol, which replaced the script mark of Roy Seaman's name. In time, the quality of the instrument eventually suffered and other models of fifes began to emerge in the United States.

McDonagh was involved with fife and drum activities for many years. That began to change by 1988 when McDonagh began to meet with some former fifing colleagues and newer players. John also renewed his collaborative friendship with Roy Seaman, who was now living in Arizona.

In 1997, John McDonagh, along with a newly formed fife study group, made changes to the original 1962 ten-hole fife. A new manufacturer, Wilson Woods, with oversight from Roy Seaman once again, produced the new fife, designated the Regimental Model. Along with this new fife, a number of fingering changes were suggested to take full advantage of the improved design. For a number of years, both Larry Trout and Wilson Woods made McDonagh fifes jointly – Trout the fish-marked familiar McDonagh Model and Wilson the Regimental Model. Eventually, both men discontinued making fifes as of 2003.

Most recently, The Cooperman Company, founded by Patrick H. Cooperman, took over the manufacture of McDonagh fifes. Cooperman had ventured himself into the concert-fifemaking world in about 1985 with his own version of a two-piece fife, as well as an acoustically correct one-piece version, through the assistance of a few key players. Though the fifes played and sold well, they had not reached the popularity of the McDonagh.

=== Healy ===
The early 1990s saw the emergence of the Healy Flute Company as a major player in the manufacture of fifes. Founder Skip Healy is a champion fife player and well known Irish flute player from Rhode Island. His fifes are two-piece, six or ten hole instruments with a Boehm style bore (cylindrical foot and truncated parabolic head) and large tone holes. Custom "Swiss Cheese" models feature even larger tone holes, to produce a stronger and more mellow tone when played in the lowest octave. Tuning is further refined than on the McDonagh. Healy fifes also offer more dynamic control than the McDonagh models. In 2007 Healy's shop was in the carriage house of the Varnum House Museum in East Greenwich, Rhode Island. By 2017 he was working from a small workshop in Wohlen, Switzerland, making about 100 fifes a year by hand from African blackwood. The Old Guard Fife and Drum Corps picked Healy's fifes after testing instruments from makers around the world, and he made 30 new ones for the corps to play at the 2017 presidential inauguration.

=== Ferrary, Model F, and Peeler ===
Simultaneously with the emergence of the McDonagh fife, a maker named Ed Ferrary assumed the mantle of the now-defunct Cloos company, producing traditional 6-hole cylindrical fifes. For those who continue to play traditional fifes, the Ferrary became the fife of choice. After Mr. Ferrary's death, his tooling and equipment were purchased for Ed Bednarz of Warehouse Point, Connecticut, who markets his fifes through outside sellers, including fellow Lancraft fifer Ed Boyle of Philadelphia and the well-known Ancient sutler, Leo Brennan of Madison, Connecticut. Bednarz brands his fifes with the name "Model F". In October 2000, another Connecticut maker, Ron Peeler, established Peeler Fifes in Moodus, Connecticut, producing a Ferrary-style instrument as well as several other, more historically oriented models copied from original early instruments.

=== Cooperman ===
The Cooperman Fife and Drum was founded in 1961. Cooperman fifes were based on the Cloos tradition, with variations intended to improve intonation. In 1975, Patrick Cooperman opened his full-time workshop in Centerbrook, Connecticut, making traditional fifes, drums and drumsticks. The Cooperman Company has remained in operation under the control of other family members since Patrick's death in 1995, and in 2006 combined its Connecticut and Vermont operations under one roof in Bellows Falls, Vermont. Now known as the Cooperman Company, Cooperman continues to make student fifes in plastic and domestic hardwoods, as well as the original Cooperman model one piece fife in exotic woods.

=== Sweet and Yamaha ===
Other manufacturers of Ancient fifes include Ralph Sweet of Enfield, Connecticut's Sweetheart Flute Company, whose Cloos model fifes most closely resemble the original instrument. After Ralph Sweet's death, his flute shop was taken over by Joseph Morneault, and is now known as Musique Morneaux. Ralph Sweet's son, Walt D. Sweet, has also established his own manufactory, Walt Sweet Flutes.

Plastic instruments referred to as "fifes" are available from Yamaha and Angel, but these are not true fifes and are more closely related to the piccolo. They are in the key of C and include a left-hand thumb hole used to play middle C. Books are published on playing this instrument through Just Flutes and Choral Seas Press.

== Historical re-enactor preferences ==
Historical re-enactors find that the traditional fifes – Ferrary, Model F, Peeler, Cooperman, and Sweet fifes – are much better suited to their historical requirements while simultaneously allowing their fifers to play together without the discordance that can result when using instruments from multiple manufacturers. Those who play competitively usually choose McDonagh or Healy fifes, corresponding with a vaguely geographical delineation (New York, New Jersey and western Connecticut groups are more likely to choose McDonagh fifes while competitors in central-to-eastern Connecticut tend towards the Healys). The notable exception to this tendency is the fife line of the Yalesville Ancient Fife and Drum Corps, who continue to use the six-hole, straight-bore metal fifes manufactured by Patrick Caccavale in Kensington, Connecticut from 1945 until his death in 1982.

== See also ==
- Military band – Class of musical ensembles
- Corps of drums – Army unit
- Fife and drum corps – Military musical ensemble
- Tin whistle – Six-holed woodwind instrument
- Pisha
