= Charles Bieger =

German soldier who fought in the American Civil War

- Born: March 25, 1844; Wiesbaden, Duchy of Nassau
- Died: August 10, 1930 (aged 86); Missouri
- Burial place: Mount Hope Cemetery Mausoleum and Crematory, Missouri
- Military career
- Allegiance: United States of America
- Branch: United States Army
- Rank: Private
- Unit: 4th Regiment Missouri Volunteer Cavalry - Company D
- Awards: Medal of Honor

Private Charles Bieger (March 25, 1844 – August 10, 1930) was a German soldier who fought in the American Civil War. On 8 July 1897 Bieger received the United States' highest award for bravery during combat, the Medal of Honor, for his action at Ivy Farm, in Mississippi on 22 February 1864.

== Biography ==
Bieger was born in Wiesbaden, Duchy of Nassau. He enlisted into Company D, 4th Missouri Volunteer Cavalry at St. Louis, Missouri after immigrating to St. Louis with his family in 1857. In February 1864 he took part in a military incursion from Memphis into Mississippi, intending to meet William T. Sherman's force at Meridian, Mississippi. Bieger's cavalry came under fire near Okolona, Mississippi. During this exchange Bieger's captain, Frederick Hunsen, was thrown from his horse, and attacked by gunfire from the enemy. Bieger pressed through the gunfire, rescuing his captain, an act of bravery that led to his being awarded the Medal of Honor.

After the war Bieger became a salesman, and lived with his family in St. Louis. He died on 10 August 1930; his remains are interred at the Mount Hope Cemetery Mausoleum and Crematory in St. Louis, Missouri. Previously in a conspicuous grave, the lot in which Bieger, his wife and three of his children are buried was updated in 2005 with an engraved floatstone, commemorating his Medal of Honor. This effort was spearheaded by Don Morfe of the Medal of Honor Historical Society.

== Medal of Honor citation ==
Voluntarily risked his life by taking a horse, under heavy fire, beyond the line of battle for the rescue of his captain, whose horse had been killed in a charge and who was surrounded by the enemy's skirmishers.

== See also ==
- List of American Civil War Medal of Honor recipients: A–F
