= Carl Schurz =

US Secretary of the Interior, Senator, German revolutionary (1829–1906)

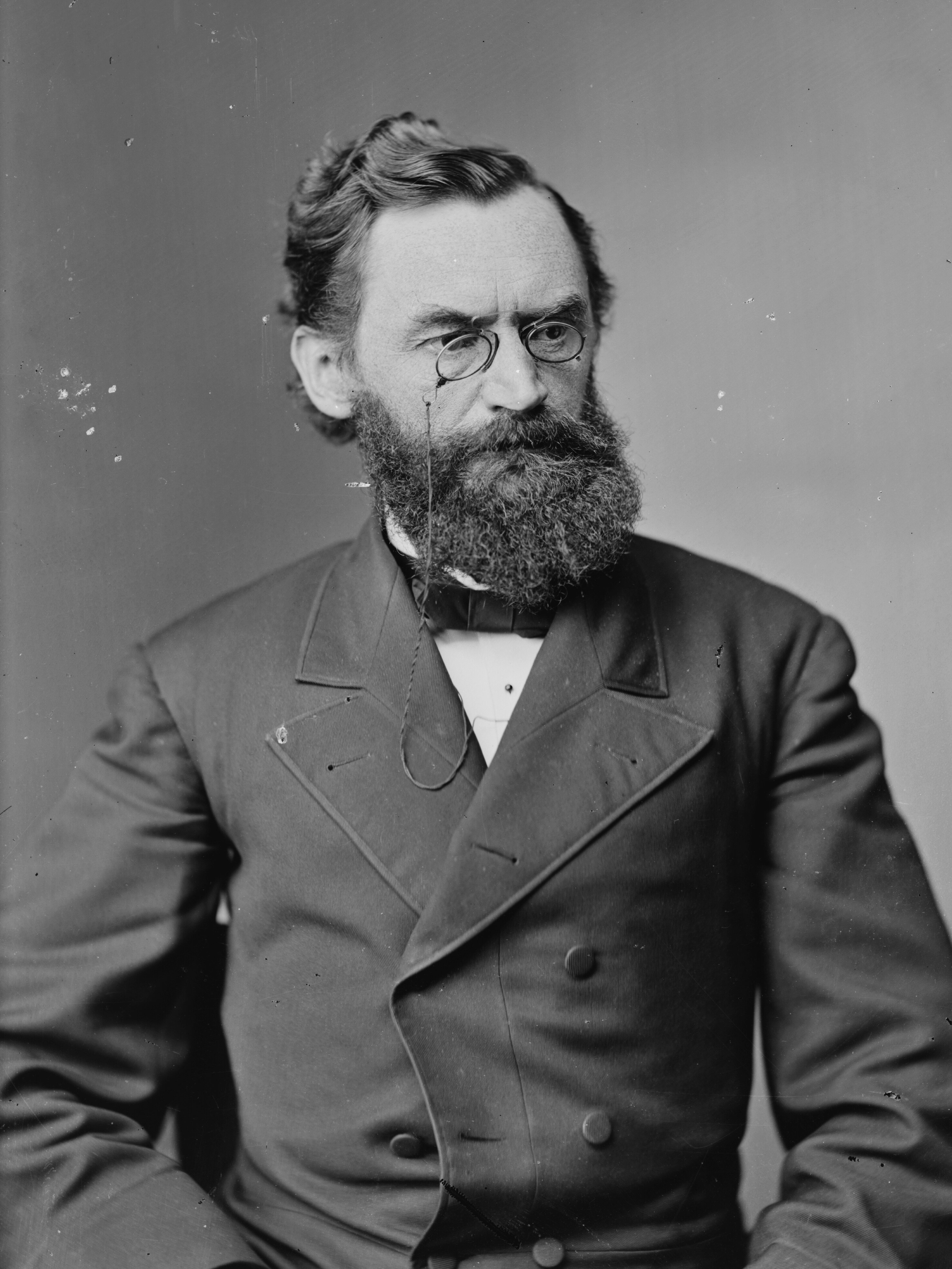
- Portrait by Mathew Brady c. 1869–1875

13th United States Secretary of the Interior
- In office March 12, 1877 – March 7, 1881
- President: Rutherford B. Hayes
- Preceded by: Zachariah Chandler
- Succeeded by: Samuel J. Kirkwood

United States Senator from Missouri
- In office March 4, 1869 – March 3, 1875
- Preceded by: John B. Henderson
- Succeeded by: Francis Cockrell

16th United States Minister to Spain
- In office July 13, 1861 – December 18, 1861
- President: Abraham Lincoln
- Preceded by: William Preston
- Succeeded by: Gustav Koerner

Personal details
- Born: Carl Christian Schurz; March 2, 1829 Liblar, Rhine Province, Kingdom of Prussia, German Confederation
- Died: May 14, 1906 (aged 77) New York City, U.S.
- Party: Republican
- Other political affiliations: Liberal Republican (1870–1872)
- Spouse: Margarethe Meyer
- Education: University of Bonn

Military service
- Allegiance: German revolutionaries United States
- Branch/service: United States Volunteers (Union Army)
- Years of service: 1848; 1862–1865
- Rank: Major general
- Battles/wars: German revolutions of 1848–1849; American Civil War; Second Battle of Bull Run; Battle of Chancellorsville; Battle of Gettysburg; Chattanooga campaign; Carolinas campaign

Carl Christian Schurz (German: [ʃʊɐ̯ts]; March 2, 1829 – May 14, 1906) was a German-American revolutionary and an American statesman, journalist, and reformer. He migrated to the United States after the German revolutions of 1848–1849 and became a prominent member of the newly-forming Republican Party. After serving as a Union general in the American Civil War, he helped found the short-lived Liberal Republican Party and became a prominent advocate of civil-service reform. Schurz represented Missouri in the United States Senate and served as the 13th United States Secretary of the Interior.

Born in the Rhine Province of the Kingdom of Prussia, Schurz fought for democratic reforms in the German revolutions of 1848–1849 as a member of the academic fraternity association Deutsche Burschenschaft. After Prussia suppressed the revolutionary movement Schurz fled to France. When police forced him to leave France he migrated to London. Like many other "Forty-Eighters", he then migrated to the United States, settling in Watertown, Wisconsin, in 1852.

After being admitted to the Wisconsin bar, he established a legal practice in Milwaukee, Wisconsin. During his time in Milwaukee, Carl Schurz was actively involved with the Milwaukee Turners, whose emphasis on physical culture and civic engagement helped shape the principles he carried into his later public service. He also became a strong advocate for the anti-slavery movement and joined the newly organized Republican Party, unsuccessfully running for Lieutenant Governor of Wisconsin. After briefly representing the United States as Minister (ambassador) to the Kingdom of Spain in 1861, Schurz served as a general in the American Civil War, fighting in the Battle of Gettysburg and other major battles.

After the war, Schurz established a newspaper in St. Louis, Missouri, and won election to the U.S. Senate, becoming the first German-born American elected to that body. Breaking with Republican President Ulysses S. Grant, Schurz helped establish the Liberal Republican Party. The party advocated civil-service reform, sound money, low tariffs, low taxes, and an end to railroad grants; it opposed Grant's efforts to protect African-American civil rights in the Southern United States during Reconstruction. Schurz chaired the 1872 Liberal Republican convention, which nominated a ticket that unsuccessfully challenged President Grant in the 1872 presidential election. Schurz lost his own 1874 re-election bid and resumed his career as a newspaper editor.

After Republican Rutherford B. Hayes won the 1876 presidential election, he appointed Schurz as his Secretary of the Interior. Schurz sought to make civil service based on merit rather than on political and party connections, and helped prevent the transfer of the Bureau of Indian Affairs to the War Department. He was elected as a member of the American Philosophical Society in 1878.

Schurz moved to New York City after Hayes left office in 1881 and briefly served as the editor of the New York Evening Post and The Nation; he later became the editorial writer for Harper's Weekly. He remained active in politics and led the "Mugwump" movement, which opposed nominating James G. Blaine in the 1884 presidential election. Schurz opposed William Jennings Bryan's bimetallism in the 1896 presidential election but supported Bryan's anti-imperialist campaign in the 1900 presidential election. Schurz died in New York City in 1906.

== Early life ==
Carl Christian Schurz was born on March 2, 1829, in Liblar (now part of Erftstadt), in Rhenish Prussia, the son of Marianne (née Jussen), a public speaker and journalist, and Christian Schurz, a schoolteacher. He studied at the Jesuit Gymnasium of Cologne, and learned piano under private instructors. Financial problems in his family obligated him to leave school a year early, without graduation. Later, he passed a special examination for graduation from gymnasium and then entered the University of Bonn.

== Revolution of 1848 ==
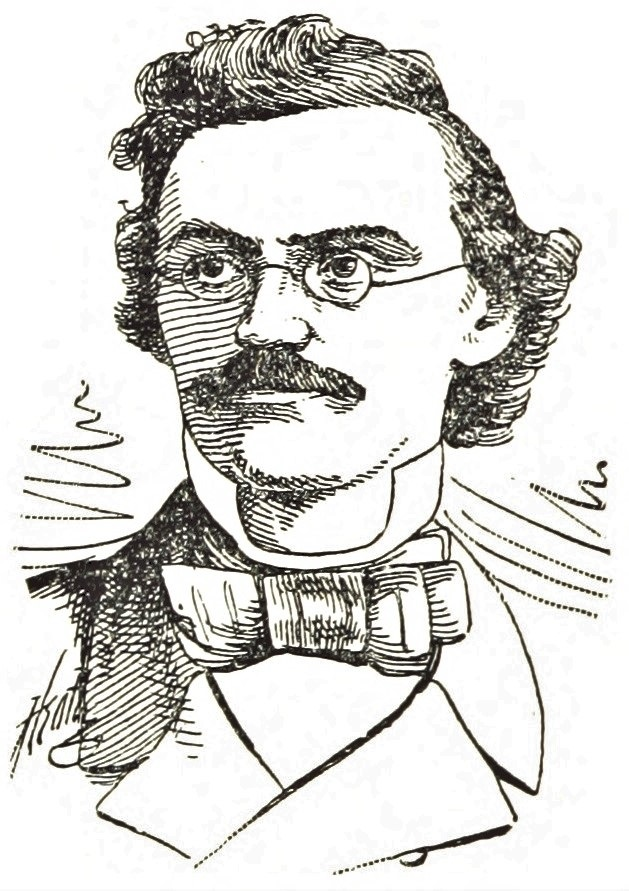
Carl Schurz as a young man

At Bonn, he developed a friendship with one of his professors, Gottfried Kinkel. He joined the nationalistic Studentenverbindung Burschenschaft Franconia at Bonn, which at the time included among its members Friedrich von Spielhagen, Johannes Overbeck, Julius Schmidt, Carl Otto Weber, Ludwig Meyer and Adolf Strodtmann. In response to the early events of the revolutions of 1848, Schurz and Kinkel founded the Bonner Zeitung, a paper advocating democratic reforms. At first Kinkel was the editor and Schurz a regular contributor.

These roles were reversed when Kinkel left for Berlin to become a member of the Prussian Constitutional Convention. When the Frankfurt rump parliament called for people to take up arms in defense of the new German constitution, Schurz, Kinkel, and others from the University of Bonn community did so. During this struggle, Schurz became acquainted with Franz Sigel, Alexander Schimmelfennig, Fritz Anneke, Friedrich Beust, Ludwig Blenker and others, many of whom he would meet again in the Union Army during the U.S. Civil War.

During the 1849 military campaign in Palatinate and Baden, he joined the revolutionary army, fighting in several battles against the Prussian Army. Schurz was adjunct officer of the commander of the artillery, Fritz Anneke, who was accompanied on the campaign by his wife, Mathilde Franziska Anneke. The Annekes would later move to the U.S., where each became Republican Party supporters. Anneke's brother, Emil Anneke, was a founder of the Republican party in Michigan. Fritz Anneke achieved the rank of colonel and became the commanding officer of the 34th Wisconsin Volunteer Infantry Regiment during the Civil War; Mathilde Anneke contributed to both the abolitionist and suffrage movements of the United States.

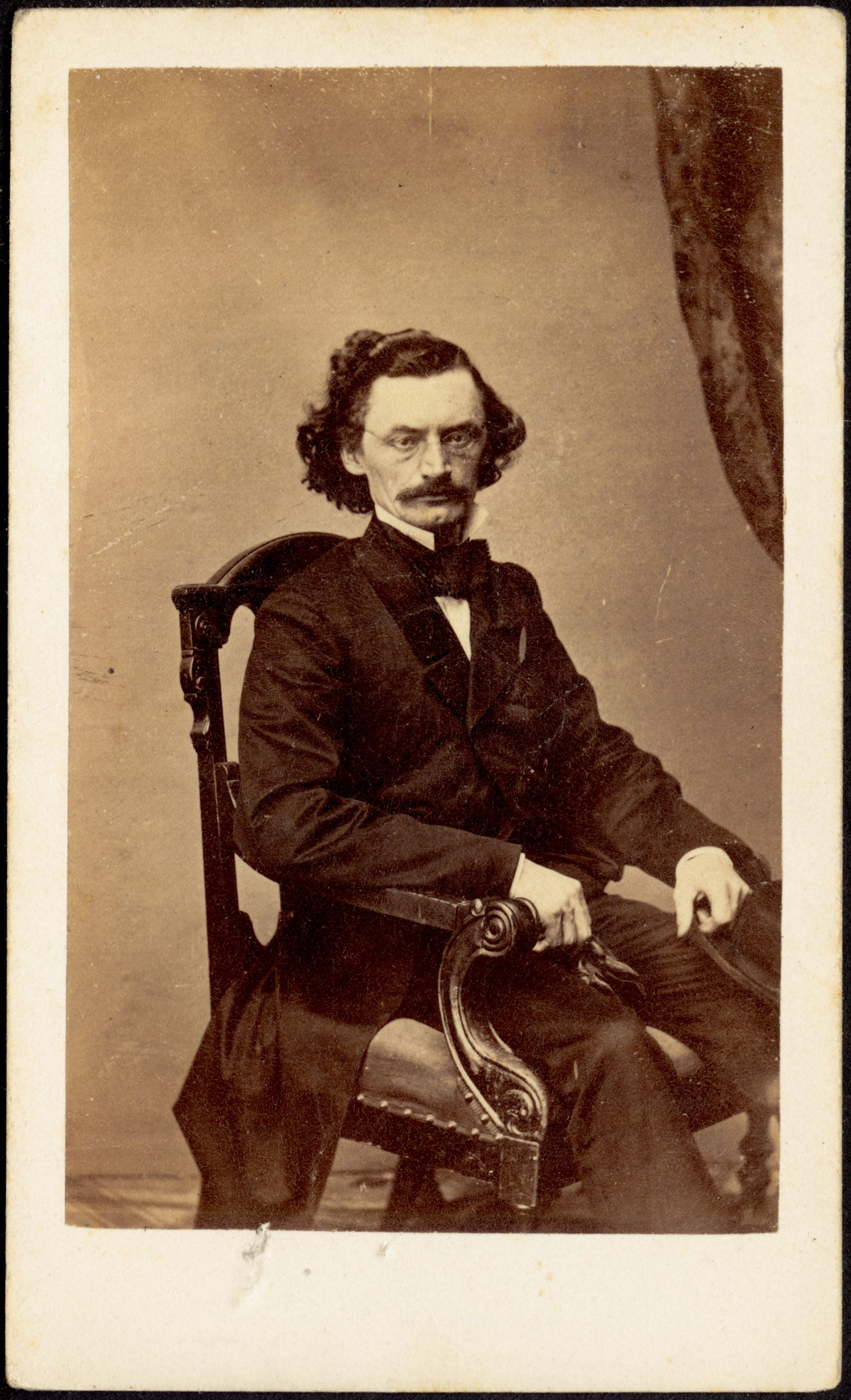
Carl Schurz, [c. 1859–1870]. Carte de Visite Collection, Boston Public Library

When the revolutionary army was defeated at the fortress of Rastatt in 1849, Schurz was inside. Knowing that the Prussians intended to kill their prisoners, Schurz managed to escape and travelled to Zürich. In 1850, he returned secretly to Prussia, rescued Kinkel from prison at Spandau and helped him to escape to Edinburgh, Scotland. Schurz then went to Paris, but the police forced him to leave France on the eve of the coup d'état of 1851, and he migrated to London. Remaining there until August 1852, he made his living by teaching the German language.

== Immigration to America ==
While in London, Schurz married fellow revolutionary Johannes Ronge's sister-in-law, Margarethe Meyer, in July 1852 and then, like many other Forty-Eighters, immigrated to the United States. Living initially in Philadelphia, Pennsylvania, the Schurzes moved to Watertown, Wisconsin, where Carl nurtured his interests in politics and Margarethe began her seminal work in early childhood education. In Wisconsin, Schurz soon became immersed in the anti-slavery movement and in politics, joining the Republican Party. In 1857, he ran unsuccessfully as a Republican for lieutenant governor. In the Illinois campaign of the next year between Abraham Lincoln and Stephen A. Douglas, he took part as a speaker on behalf of Lincoln—mostly in German—which raised Lincoln's popularity among German-American voters. In 1858, Schurz was admitted to the Wisconsin bar and began to practice law in Milwaukee. Beginning 1859, his law partner was Halbert E. Paine. With Paine's encouragement, Schurz took more of an interest in politics and public speaking than in law.

In the state campaign of 1859, Schurz made a speech attacking the Fugitive Slave Law, arguing for states' rights. In Faneuil Hall, Boston, on April 18, 1859, he delivered an oration on "True Americanism", which, coming from an alien, was intended to clear the Republican party of the charge of "nativism". Wisconsin Germans unsuccessfully urged his nomination for governor in 1859. In the 1860 Republican National Convention, Schurz was spokesman of the delegation from Wisconsin, which voted for William H. Seward. Despite this, Schurz was on the committee which brought Lincoln the news of his nomination.

After Lincoln's election and in spite of Seward's objection, Lincoln sent Schurz as minister to Spain in 1861, in part because of Schurz's European record as a revolutionary. While there, Schurz did not manage to cause any lasting impact on the Spanish authorities regarding the conflict. He returned to the US in early 1862 to join the Union army.

== American Civil War ==
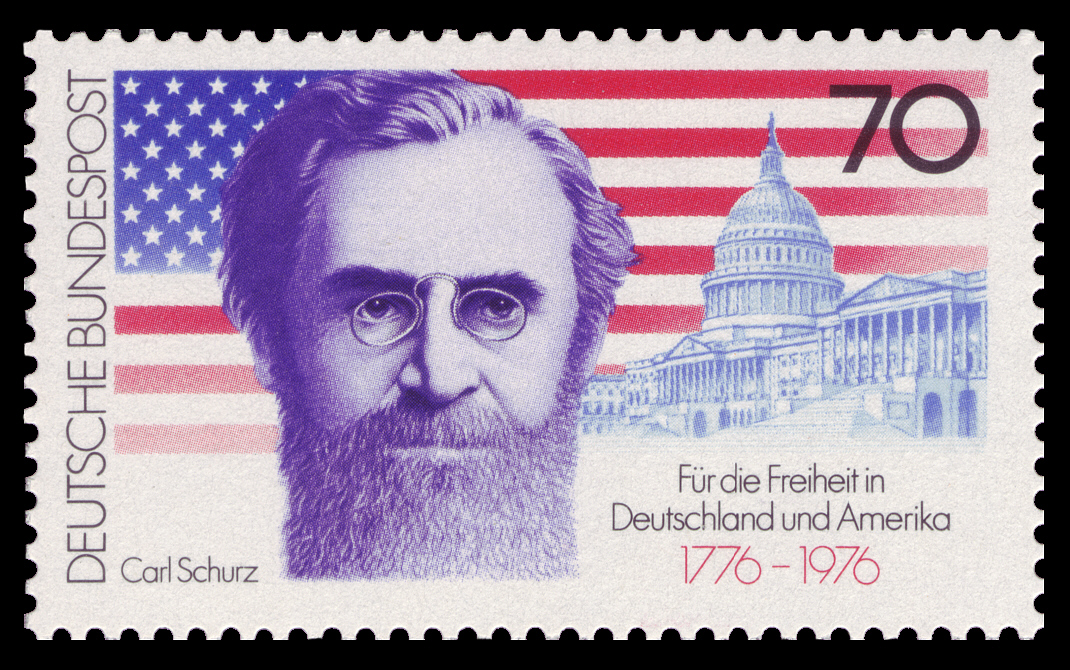
"For freedom in Germany and America": West German commemorative stamp featuring Schurz for the United States Bicentennial, 1976

During the American Civil War, Schurz served with distinction as a general in the Union Army. Persuading Lincoln to grant him a commission, Schurz was made a brigadier general of Union volunteers in April 1862. In June, he took command of a division, first under John C. Frémont, and then in Franz Sigel's corps, with which he took part in the Second Battle of Bull Run in August 1862. He was promoted to major general in 1863 and was assigned to lead a division in the XI Corps at the battles of Chancellorsville and Gettysburg, both under General Oliver O. Howard. A bitter controversy began between Schurz and Howard over the strategy employed at Chancellorsville, resulting in the routing of the XI Corps by the Confederate corps led by Thomas J. "Stonewall" Jackson. Two months later, the XI Corps again broke during the first day of Gettysburg. Containing several German-American units, the XI Corps performance during both battles was heavily criticized by the press, fueling anti-immigrant sentiments.

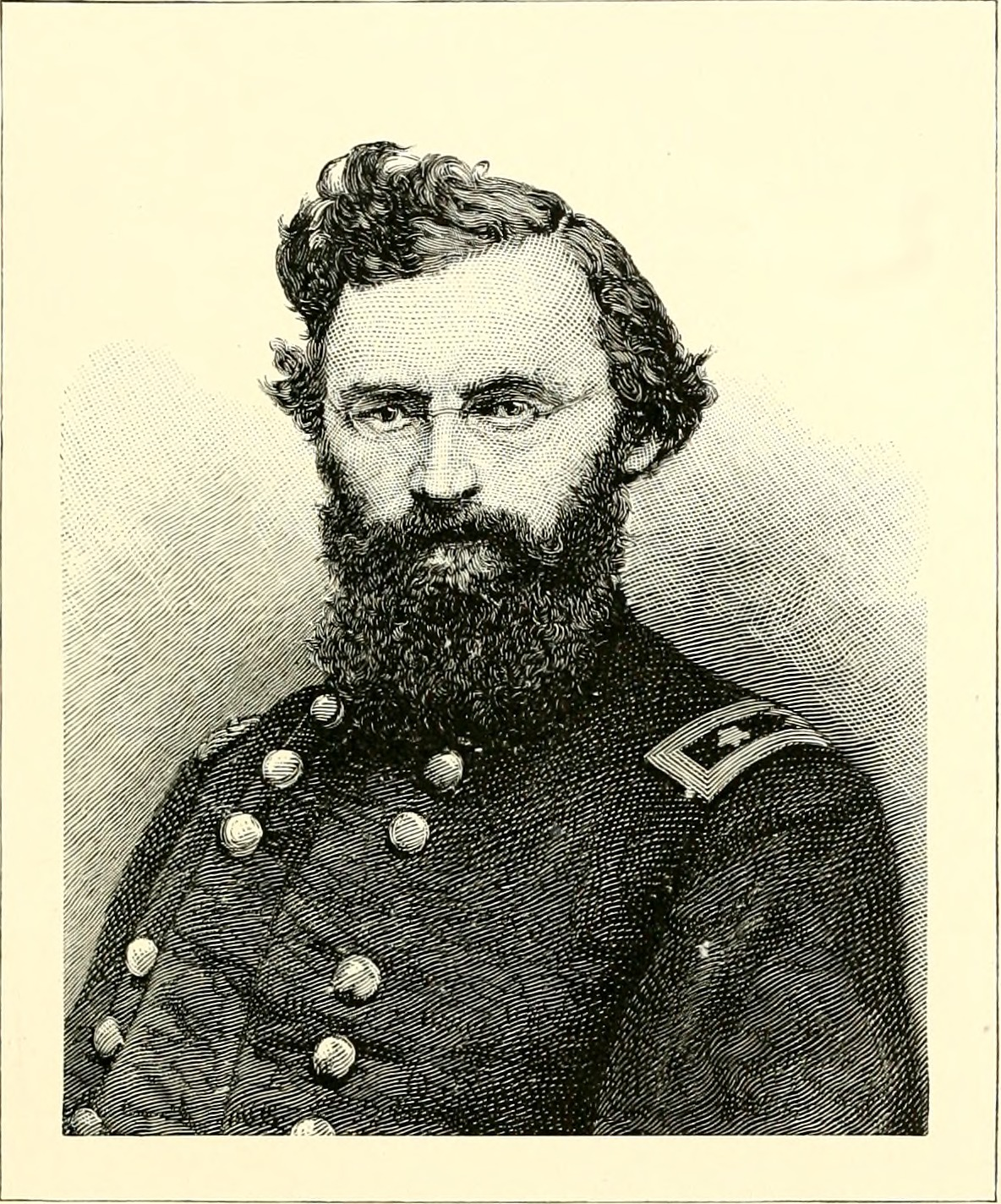
Carl Schurz as Major General of Volunteers during the Civil War

Following Gettysburg, Schurz's division was deployed to Tennessee and participated in the Battle of Chattanooga. There he served with the future Senator Joseph B. Foraker, John Patterson Rea, and Luther Morris Buchwalter, brother to Morris Lyon Buchwalter. Senator Charles Sumner (R-MA) was a Congressional observer during the Chattanooga Campaign. Later, Schurz was put in command of a Corps of Instruction at Nashville. He briefly returned to active service, where in the last months of the war he was with Sherman's army in North Carolina as chief of staff of Henry Slocum's Army of Georgia. He resigned from the army after the war ended in April 1865.

In the summer of 1865, President Andrew Johnson sent Schurz through the South to study conditions. They then quarreled because Schurz supported General Slocum's order forbidding the organization of militia in Mississippi. Schurz delivered a report to the U.S. Senate documenting conditions in the South which concluded that Reconstruction had succeeded in restoring the basic functioning of government but failed in restoring the loyalty of the people and protecting the rights of the newly legally emancipated who were still considered the slaves of society. It called for a national commitment to maintaining control over the South until free labor was secure, arguing that without national action, Black Codes and violence including numerous extrajudicial killings documented by Schurz were likely to continue. The report was ignored by the President, but it helped fuel the movement pushing for a larger congressional role in Reconstruction and holding Southern states to higher standards.

== Newspaper career ==
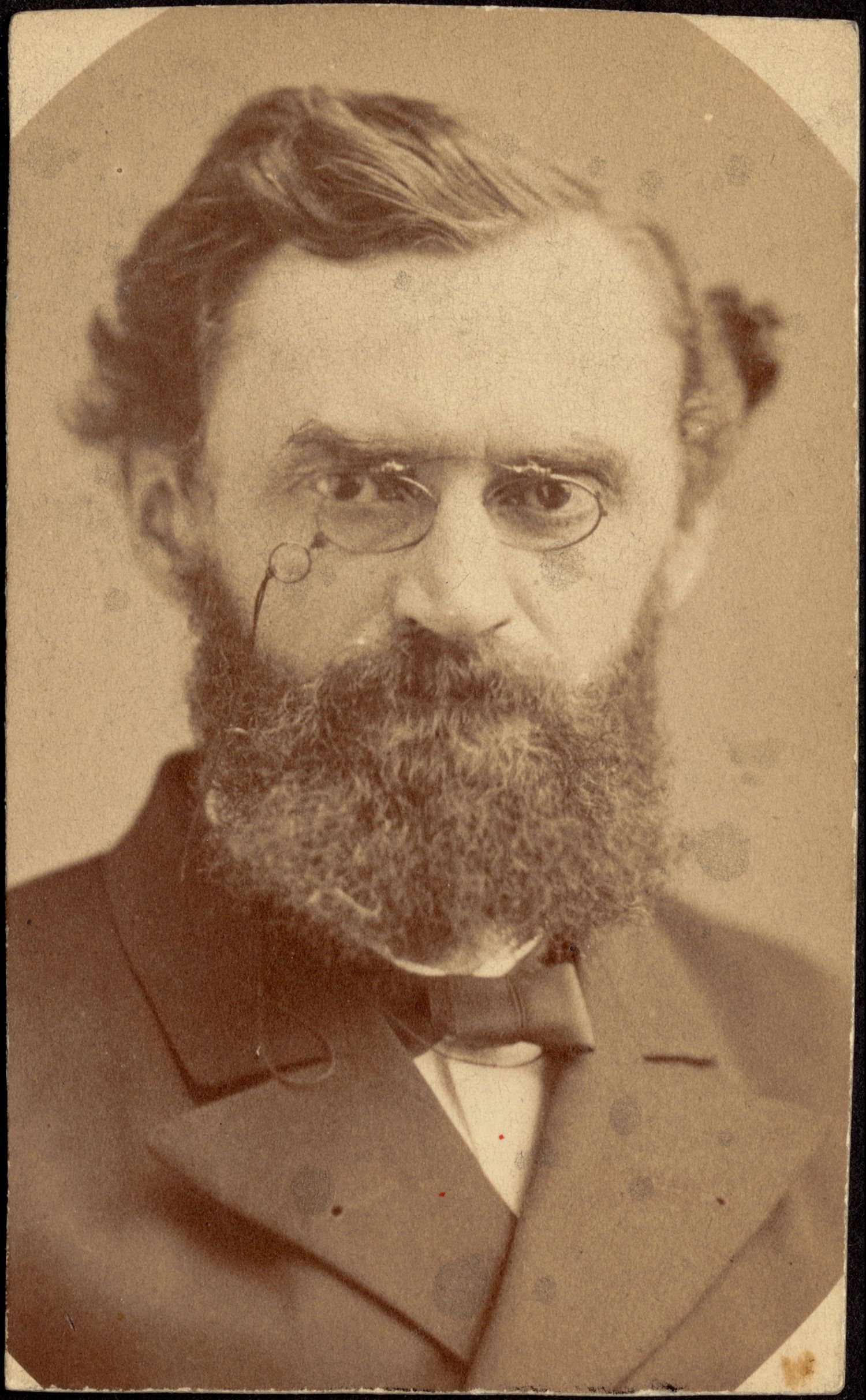
Carl Schurz, [c. 1859–1870]. Carte de Visite Collection, Boston Public Library

In 1866, Schurz moved to Detroit, where he was chief editor of the Detroit Post. The following year, he moved to St. Louis, becoming editor and joint proprietor with Emil Preetorius of the German-language Westliche Post (Western Post), where he hired Joseph Pulitzer as a cub reporter. In the winter of 1867–1868, he traveled in Germany; and gave an account of his interview with Otto von Bismarck in his Reminiscences. He spoke against "repudiation" of war debts and for "honest money"—code for going back on the gold standard—during the presidential campaign of 1868.

== U.S. Senator ==
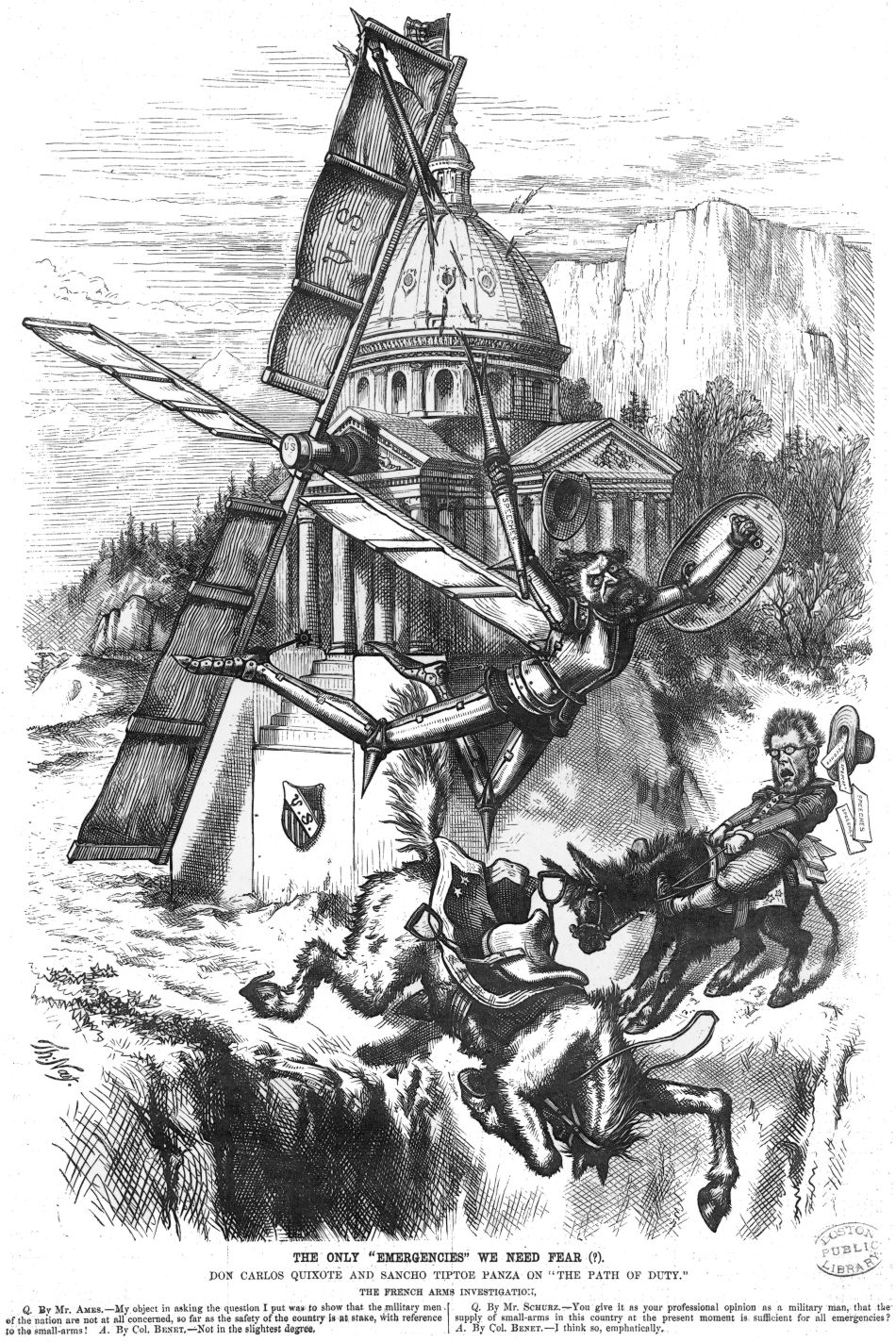
Carl Schurz is Don Quixote in this cartoon by Thomas Nast from Harper's Weekly of April 6, 1872

In 1868, he was elected to the United States Senate from Missouri, becoming the first German American in that body. He earned a reputation for his speeches, which advocated fiscal responsibility, anti-imperialism, and integrity in government. During this period, he broke with the Grant administration, starting the Liberal Republican movement in Missouri, which in 1870 elected B. Gratz Brown governor.

After William P. Fessenden's death, Schurz became a member of the Committee on Foreign Affairs where Schurz opposed Grant's Southern policy as well as his bid to annex Santo Domingo. Schurz was identified with the committee's investigation of arms sales to and cartridge manufacture for the French army by the United States government during the Franco-Prussian War. In 1869, he became the first U.S. Senator to offer a Civil Service Reform bill to Congress. During Reconstruction, Schurz was opposed to federal military enforcement and protection of African American civil rights, and held nineteenth century ideas of European superiority and fears of miscegenation.

In 1870, Schurz helped form the Liberal Republican Party, which opposed President Ulysses S. Grant's annexation of Santo Domingo and his use of the military to destroy the Ku Klux Klan in the South under the Enforcement Acts. In 1872, he presided over the Liberal Republican Party convention, which nominated Horace Greeley for President. Schurz's own choice was Charles Francis Adams or Lyman Trumbull, and the convention did not represent Schurz's views on the tariff. Schurz campaigned for Greeley anyway. Especially in this campaign, and throughout his career as a Senator and afterwards, he was a target for the pen of Harper's Weekly artist Thomas Nast, usually in an unfavorable way. The election was a debacle for the Greeley supporters. Grant won by a landslide, and Greeley died shortly after election day in November, before the Electoral College had even met.

Schurz lost the 1874 Senatorial election to Democratic Party challenger and former Confederate Francis Cockrell. After leaving office, he worked as an editor for various newspapers. In 1875, he assisted in the successful campaign of Rutherford B. Hayes to regain the office of Governor of Ohio. In 1877, Schurz was appointed United States Secretary of the Interior by Hayes, who had been by then been elected President of the United States. Although Schurz honestly attempted to reduce the effects of racism toward Native Americans and was partially successful at cleaning up corruption, his recommended actions towards American Indians "in light of late twentieth-century developments" were repressive. Indians were forced to move into low-quality reservation lands that were unsuitable for tribal economic and cultural advancement. Promises made to Indian chiefs at White House meetings with President Rutherford B. Hayes and Schurz were often broken.

== Secretary of the Interior ==
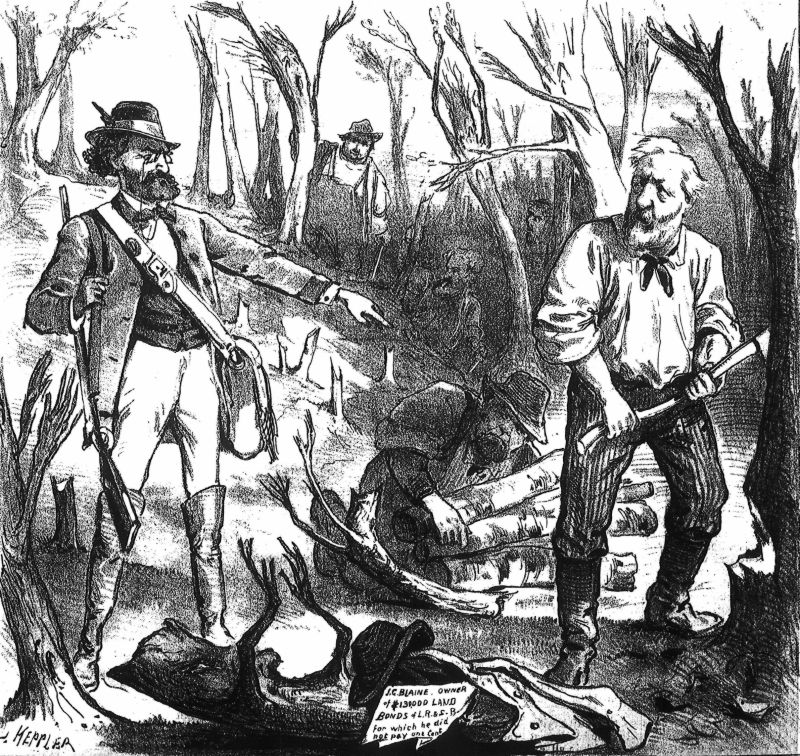
Carl Schurz and James Blaine in a Puck political cartoon of c. 1878 by J. Keppler

In 1876, he supported Hayes for president and Hayes named him secretary of the interior, following much of his advice in other cabinet appointments and in his inaugural address. In this department, Schurz put into force his belief that merit should be the principal consideration in appointing people to jobs in the Civil Service. He was not in favor of permitting removals except for cause, and supported requiring competitive examinations for candidates for clerkships. His efforts to remove political patronage met with only limited success, however. As an early conservationist, Schurz prosecuted land thieves and attracted public attention to the necessity of forest preservation.

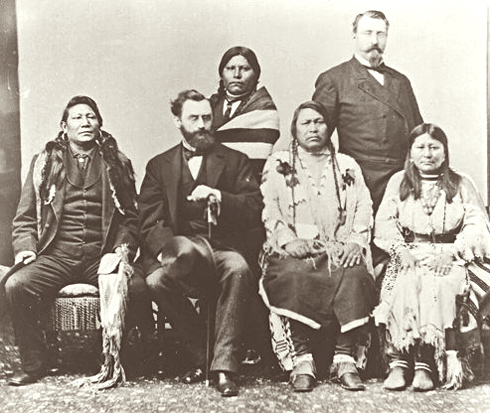
Delegation of Ute Indians in Washington, D.C. in 1880, (left to right) seated: Chief Ignatio of the Southern Utes, Carl Schurz U.S. Secretary of the Interior, Chief Ouray, Chipeta (wife to Ouray), and standing: Ute leader Woretsiz, General Charles Adams (Colorado Indian agent)

During Schurz's tenure as Secretary of the Interior, a movement to transfer the Office of Indian Affairs to the control of the War Department began, assisted by the strong support of Gen. William Tecumseh Sherman. Restoration of the Indian Office to the War Department, which was anxious to regain control in order to continue its "pacification" program, was opposed by Schurz, and ultimately the Indian Office remained in the Interior Department. The Indian Office had been the most corrupt office in the Interior Department. Positions in it were based on political patronage and were seen as granting license to use the reservations for personal enrichment. Because Schurz realized that the service would have to be cleansed of such corruption before anything positive could be accomplished, he instituted a wide-scale inspection of the service, dismissed several officials, and began civil service reforms whereby positions and promotions were to be based on merit not political patronage.

Schurz's leadership of the Indian Affairs Office was at times controversial. While certainly not an architect of forced displacement of Native Americans, he continued the practice. In response to several nineteenth-century reformers, however, he later changed his mind and promoted an assimilationist policy.

== Later life ==
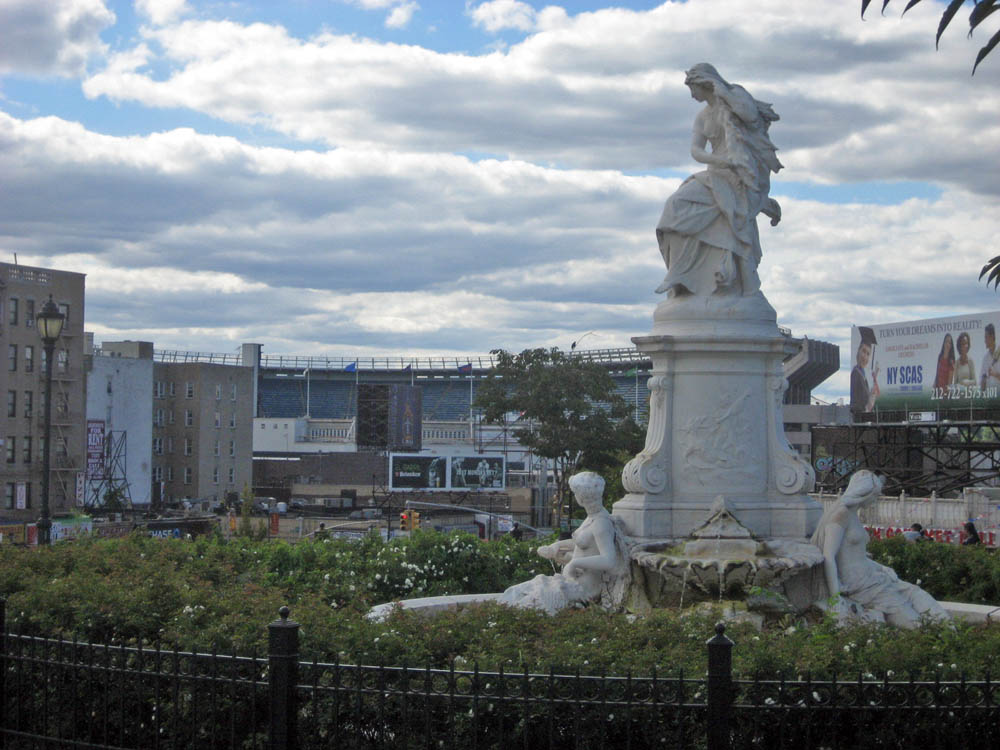
When a statuary tribute to German poet Heinrich Heine was resisted because of anti-Semitic opponents in Germany, Schurz's activism aided in its relocation across the Atlantic to New York.

Upon leaving the Interior Department in 1881, Schurz moved to New York City. That year German-born Henry Villard, president of the Northern Pacific Railway, acquired the New York Evening Post and The Nation and turned the management over to Schurz, Horace White and Edwin L. Godkin. Schurz left the Post in the autumn of 1883 because of differences over editorial policies regarding corporations and their employees.

In 1884, he was a leader in the Independent (or Mugwump) movement against the nomination of James Blaine for president and for the election of Grover Cleveland. From 1888 to 1892, he was general American representative of the Hamburg American Steamship Company. In 1892, he succeeded George William Curtis as president of the National Civil Service Reform League and held this office until 1901. He also succeeded Curtis as editorial writer for Harper's Weekly in 1892 and held this position until 1898. In 1895 he spoke for the Fusion anti-Tammany Hall ticket in New York City. He opposed William Jennings Bryan for president in 1896, speaking for sound money and not under the auspices of the Republican party; he supported Bryan four years later because of anti-imperialism beliefs, which also led to his membership in the American Anti-Imperialist League.

True to his anti-imperialist convictions, Schurz exhorted McKinley to resist the urge to annex land following the Spanish–American War. He authored an opinion piece warning that prominent imperialists would take in "Spanish- Americans, with all the mixtures of Indian and negro blood, and Malays and other unspeakable Asiatics, by the tens of millions!" In the 1904 election he supported Alton B. Parker, the Democratic candidate. Carl Schurz lived in a summer cottage in Northwest Bay on Lake George, New York which was built by his good friend Abraham Jacobi.

== Family ==
Schurz was married to Margarethe Schurz in July, 1852; together they had five children: Agathe, Marianne, Emma, Carl Lincoln, and Herbert. Schurz was the cousin of Edmund Jüssen (also spelled Jussen), a German expatriate, forty-eighter, and attorney who worked in Columbus, Wisconsin. In 1856 Schurz's sister Antonie Schurz married Jüssen. Jüssen, like Schurz fought in the American Civil War for the 23rd Wisconsin Infantry Regiment as a Lieutenant Colonel.

== Death and legacy ==
Schurz died at age 77 on May 14, 1906, in New York City, and is buried in Sleepy Hollow Cemetery, Sleepy Hollow, New York. Schurz's wife, Margarethe Schurz, was instrumental in establishing the kindergarten system in the United States.

Schurz is famous for saying: "My country, right or wrong; if right, to be kept right; and if wrong, to be set right." On the 2025 anniversary of his birth, he was quoted by Anu Garg of Wordsmith.org as saying, "We have come to a point where it is loyalty to resist, and treason to submit." He was portrayed by Edward G. Robinson as a friend of the surviving Cheyenne Indians in John Ford's 1964 film Cheyenne Autumn.

== Works ==
Schurz published a volume of speeches (1865), a two-volume biography of Henry Clay (1887), essays on Abraham Lincoln (1899) and Charles Sumner (posthumous, 1951), and his Reminiscences (posthumous, 1907–09). His later years were spent writing the memoirs recorded in his Reminiscences which he was not able to finish, reaching only the beginnings of his U.S. Senate career. Schurz was a member of the Literary Society of Washington from 1879 to 1880.

== Memorials ==
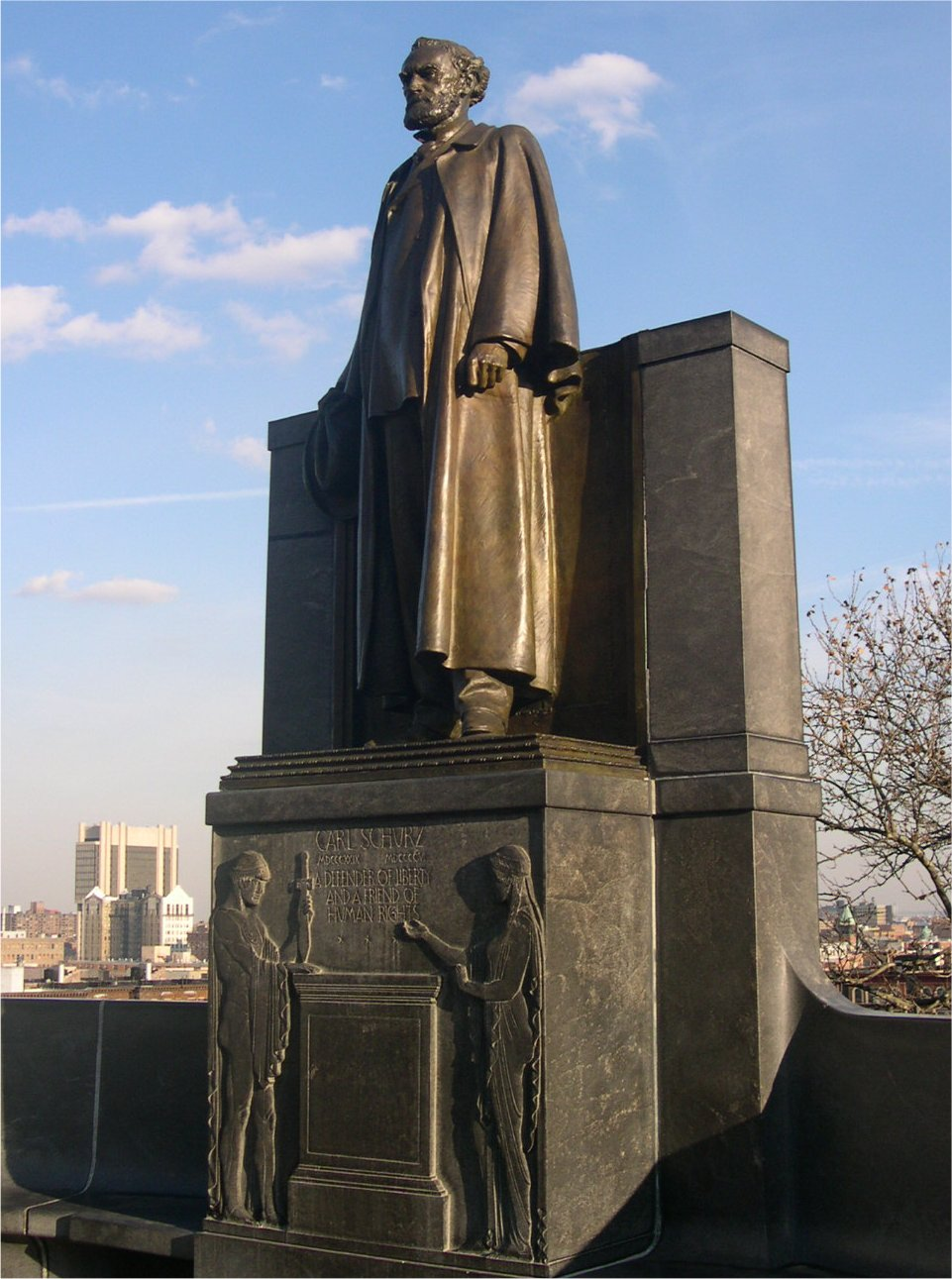
Schurz monument in New York City

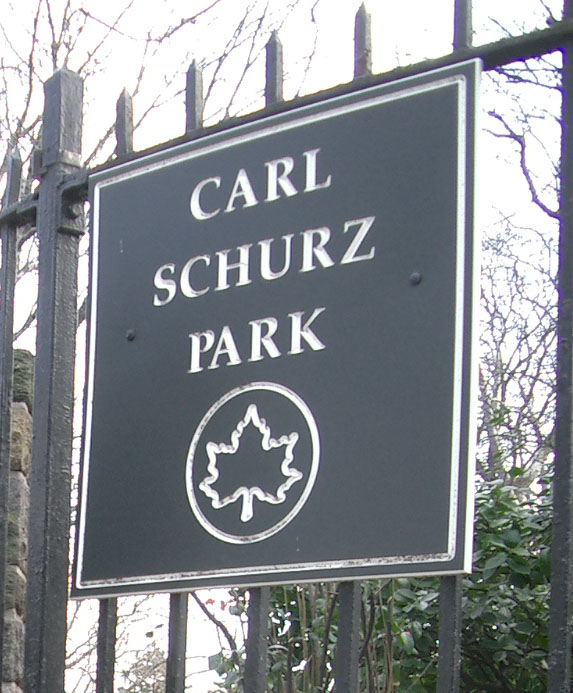
Carl Schurz Park, Upper East Side Manhattan, New York City

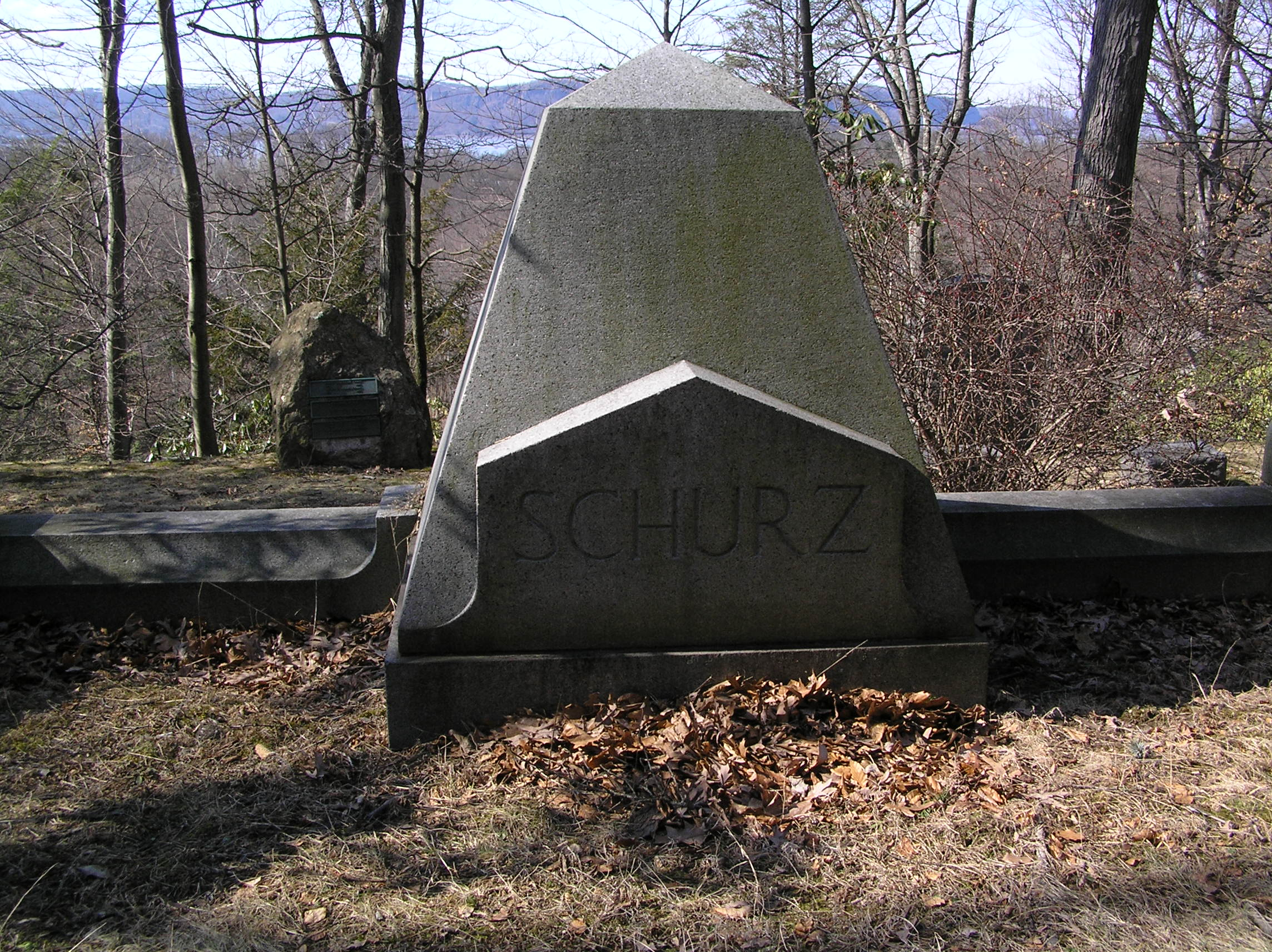
Carl Schurz grave, Sleepy Hollow, N.Y.

Schurz is commemorated in numerous places around the United States:

- Carl Schurz Park, a 14.9-acre (6.0 ha) park in New York City, adjacent to Yorkville, Manhattan, overlooking the waters of Hell Gate. Named for Schurz in 1910, it is the site of Gracie Mansion, the residence of the Mayor of New York since 1942
- Karl Bitter's 1913 monument to Schurz ("Defender Of Liberty And A Friend Of Human Rights") outside Morningside Park, at Morningside Drive and 116th Street in New York City
- Karl Bitter's 1914 monument to Schurz ("Our Greatest German American") in Menominee Park, Oshkosh, Wisconsin
- Carl Schurz and Abraham Jacobi Memorial Park in Bolton Landing, New York
- Schurz, Nevada named after him
- Carl Schurz Drive, a residential street in the northern end of his former home of Watertown, Wisconsin
- Schurz Elementary School, in Watertown, Wisconsin
- Carl Schurz Park, a private membership park in Stone Bank (Town of Merton), Wisconsin, on the shore of Moose Lake
- Carl Schurz Forest, a forested section of the Ice Age Trail near Monches, Wisconsin
- Carl Schurz High School, a historic landmark in Chicago, built in 1910.
- Schurz Hall, a student residence at the University of Missouri.
- Carl Schurz Elementary School in New Braunfels, Texas
- Mount Schurz, a mountain in eastern Yellowstone, north of Eagle Peak and south of Atkins Peak, named in 1885 by the United States Geological Survey, to honor Schurz's commitment to protecting Yellowstone National Park
- In 1983, the U.S. Postal Service issued a 4-cent Great Americans series postage stamp with his name and portrait
- In World War II, the United States Liberty ship SS Carl Schurz was named in his honor.
- The USS Schurz was commissioned in 1917 as a Patrol Gun Boat. Formerly the small unprotected cruiser SMS Geier of the German Imperial Navy, the ship had been taken over by the U.S. Navy when hostilities between Germany and the U.S. commenced, after having been interned in Honolulu in 1914. The Schurz sank after a collision on 21 June 1918 off Beaufort Inlet, North Carolina.

Several memorials in Germany also commemorate the life and work of Schurz, including:

- Carl-Schurz Kaserne, in Bremerhaven, has been home to U.S. Army units for several decades, including elements of the 2nd Armored Division (Forward). Today it houses Army transportation units and some civilian commercial activities related to commercial shipping.
- Streets named after him in Berlin-Spandau, Bremen, Stuttgart, Erftstadt-Liblar, Giessen, Heidelberg, Karlsruhe, Cologne, Neuss, Rastatt, Paderborn, Pforzheim, Pirmasens, Leipzig, Wuppertal, and Bad Kreuznach
- Schools in Bonn, Bremen, Berlin-Spandau, Frankfurt am Main, Rastatt and his place of birth, Erftstadt-Liblar
- The Carl-Schurz-Haus Freiburg, in Freiburg im Breisgau is an innovative institute (formerly Amerika-Haus) fostering German-American cultural relations
- an urban area in Frankfurt am Main
- the Carl Schurz Bridge over the Neckar River
- a memorial fountain as well as the house where Lt. Schurz was billeted in 1849 in Rastatt
- German Armed Forces barracks in Hardheim
- German federal stamps in 1952 and 1976
- Carl-Schurz-Medal awarded annually to one distinguished citizen of his home town.

== Harper's Weekly gallery ==
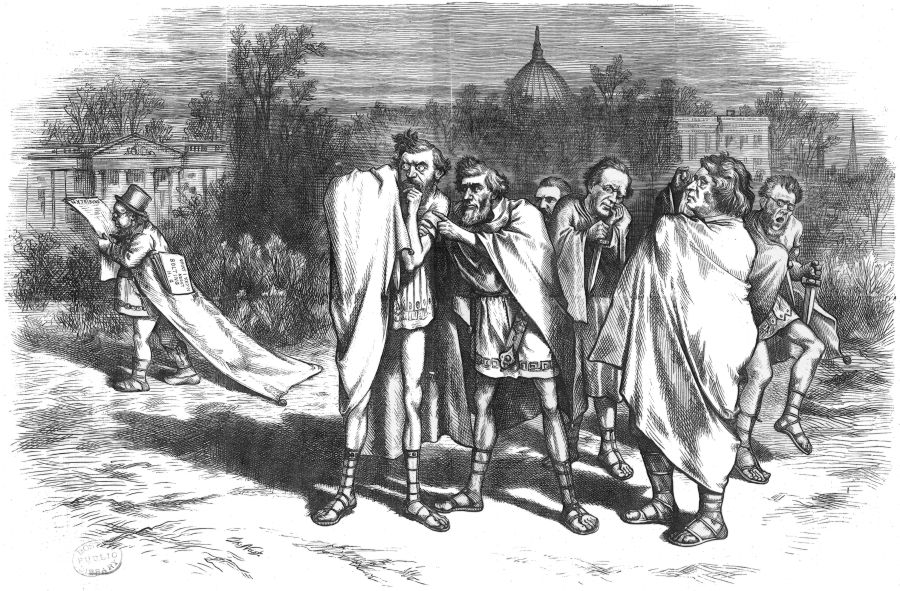
Schurz and other anti-Grant "conspirators" – March 16, 1872

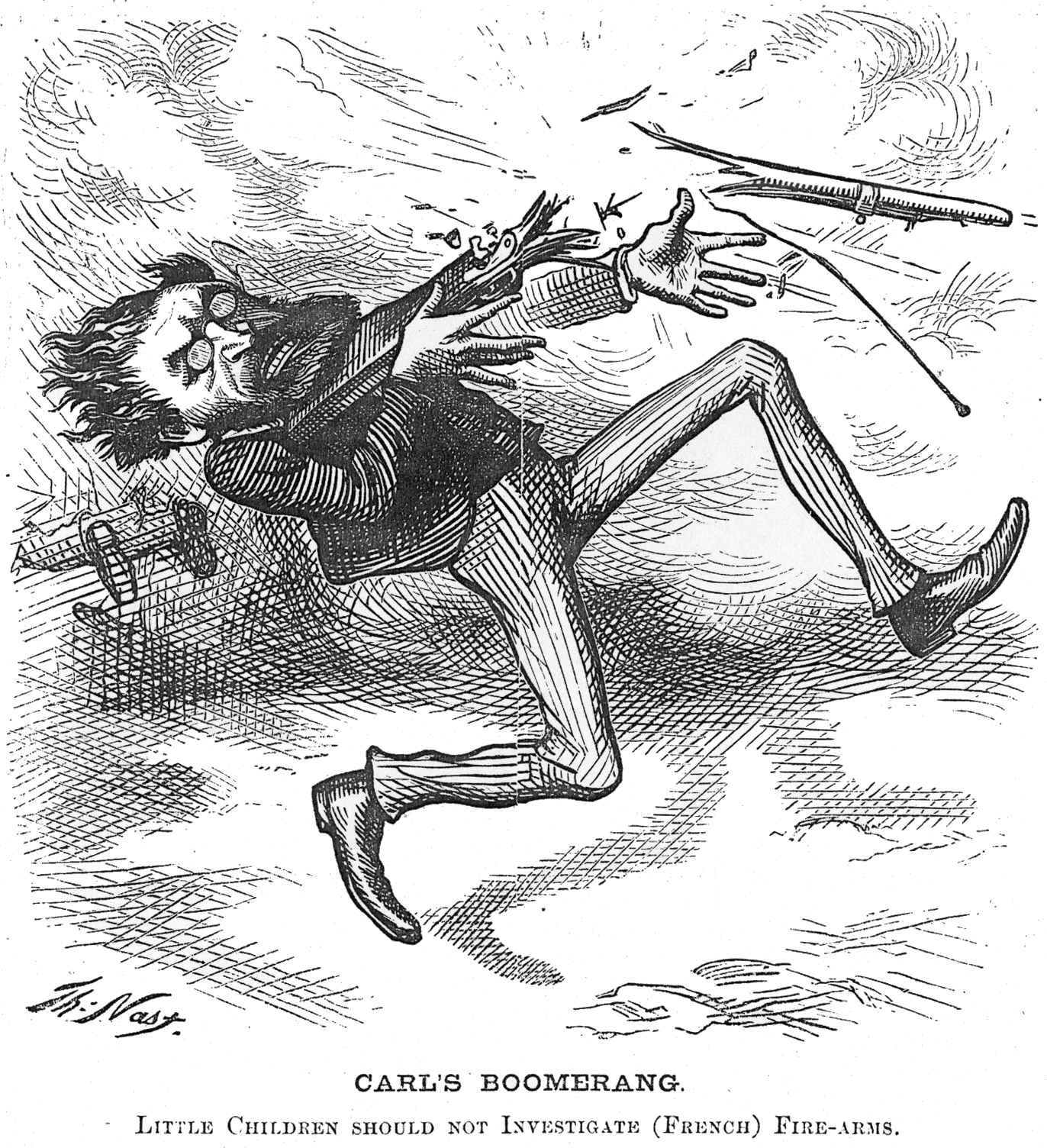
French Arms investigation – May 11, 1872

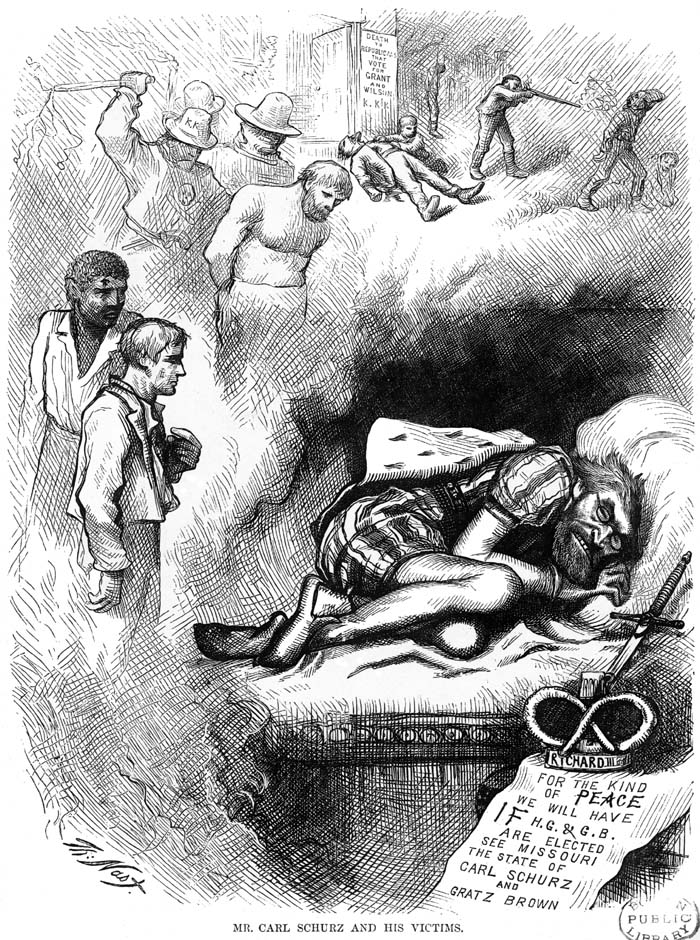
Schurz and his victims – September 7, 1872

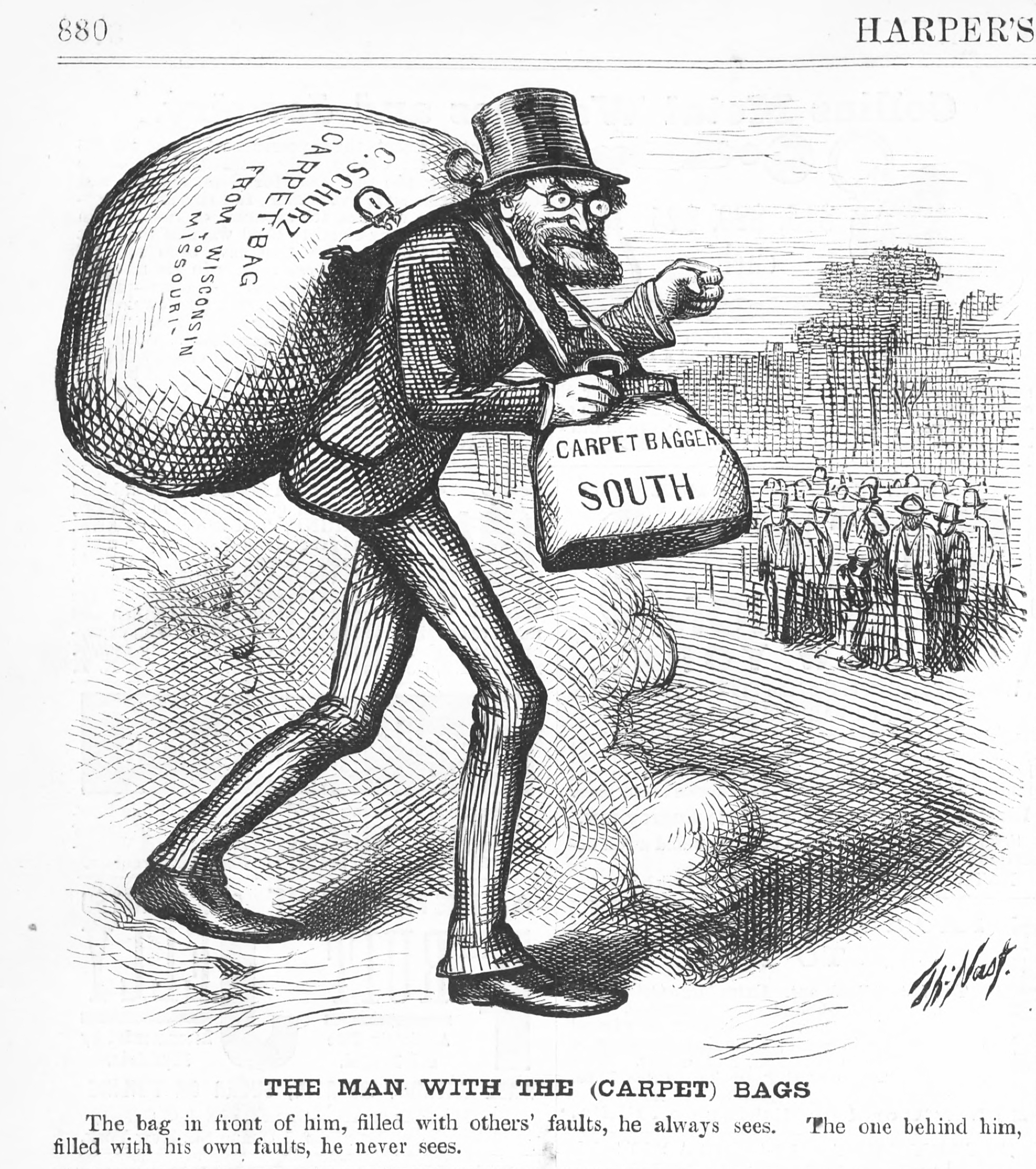
Schurz is depicted as a carpetbagger - November 9, 1872.

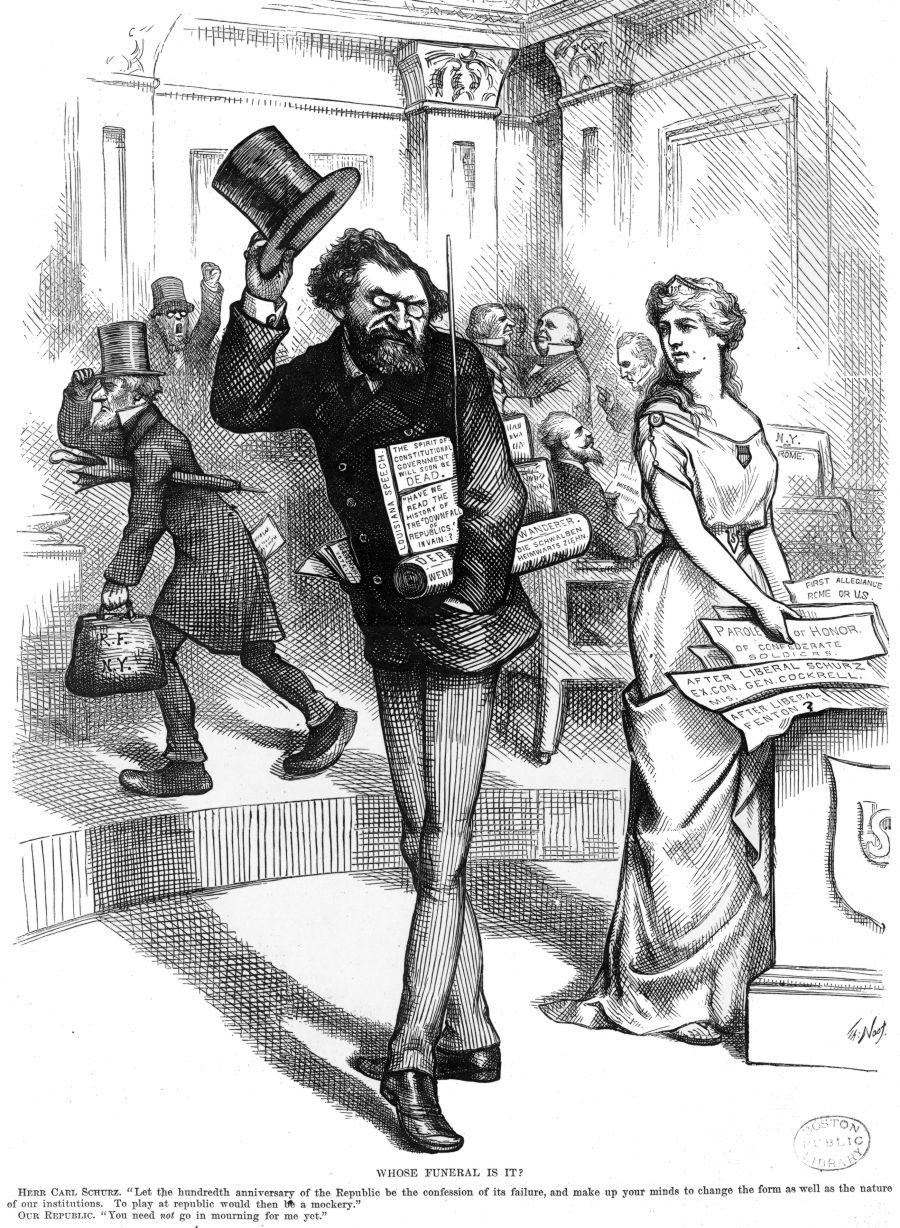
Schurz leaves the U.S. Senate – March 20, 1875

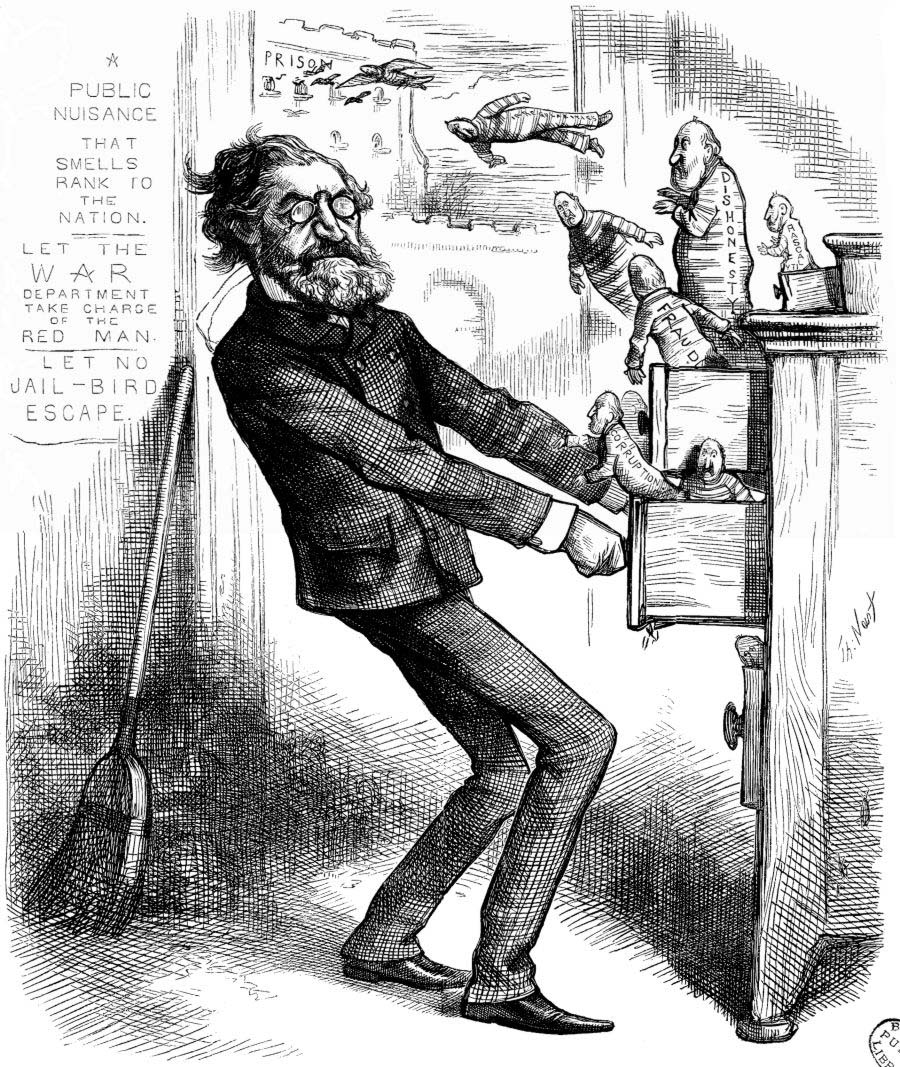
Schurz reforms the Indian Bureau – January 26, 1878

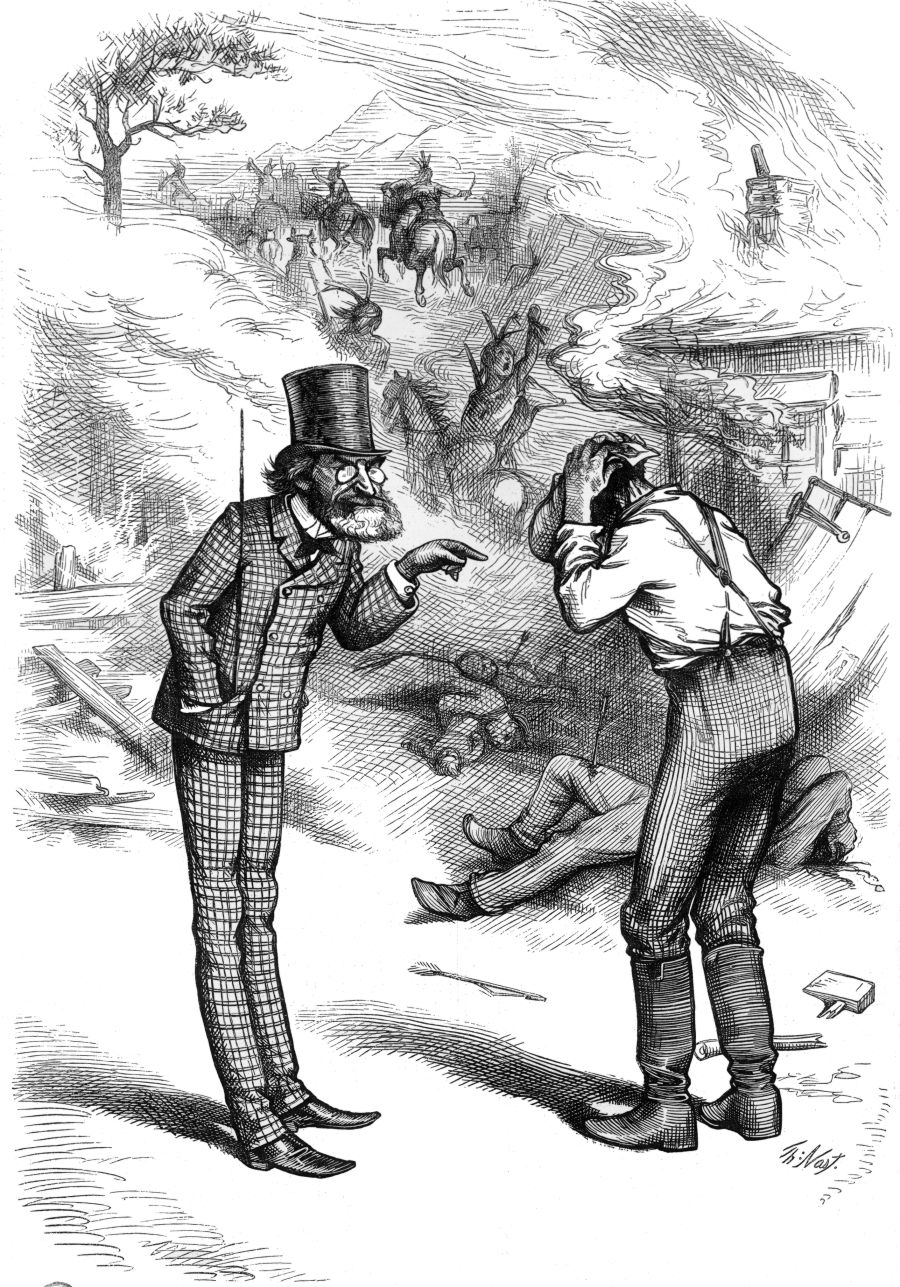
Schurz counsels a wounded settler – December 28, 1878

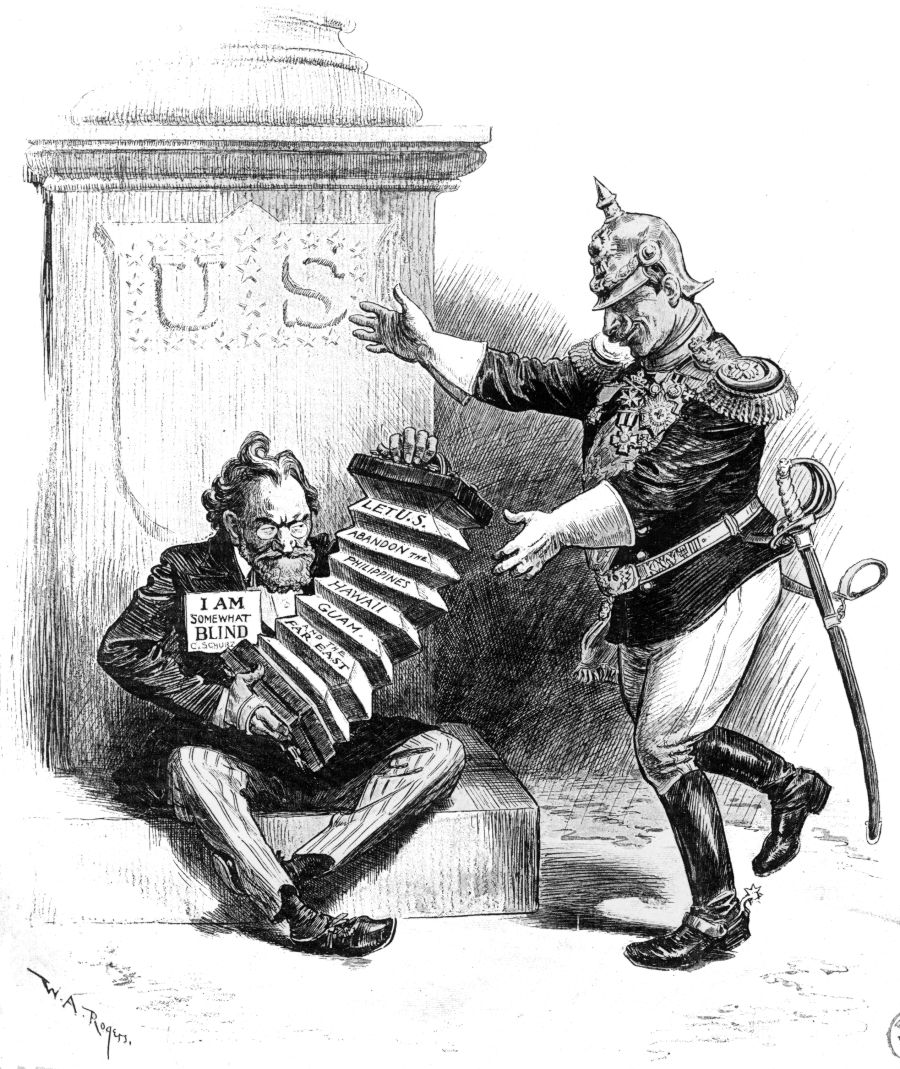
Schurz and Wilhelm II – July 14, 1900

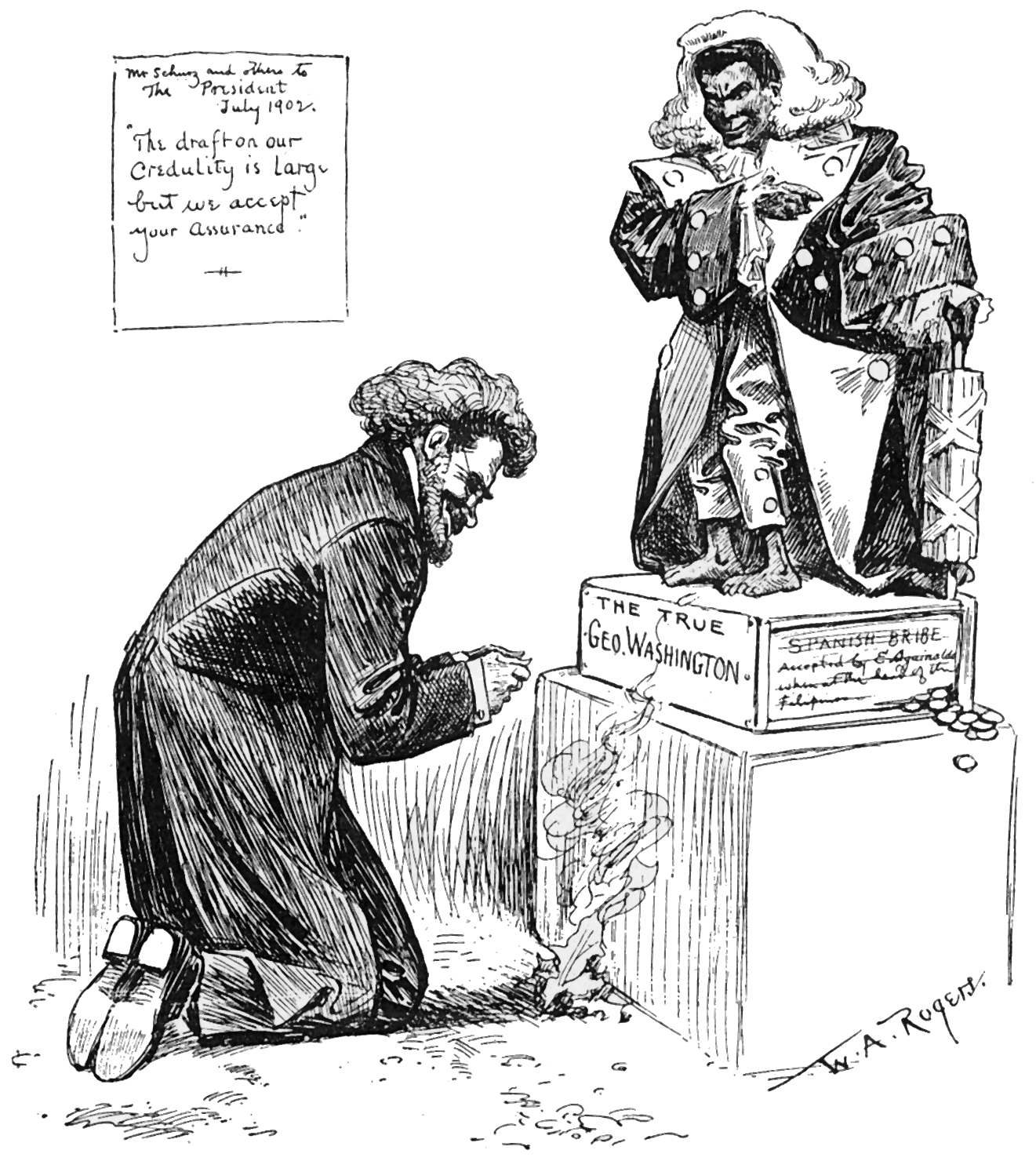
Schurz and Emilio Aguinaldo – August 9, 1902

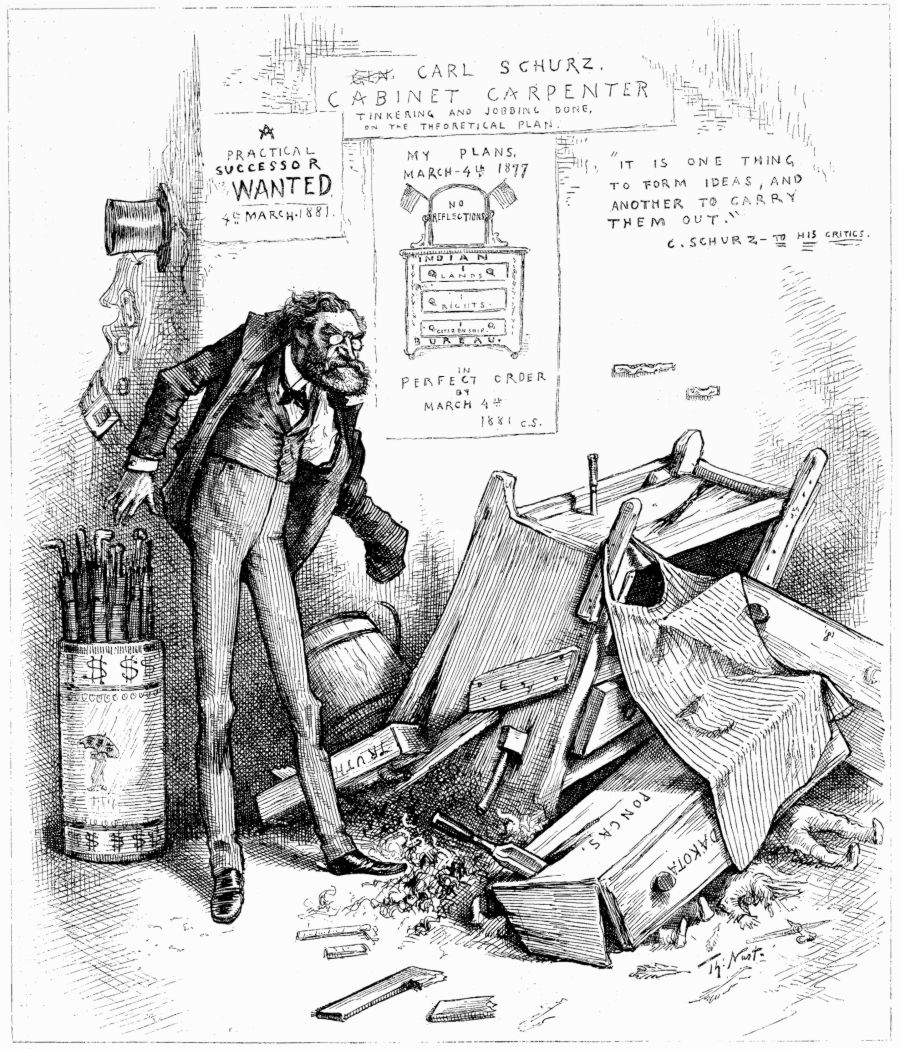
- February 26, 1881

== See also ==
- List of foreign-born United States Cabinet members
- List of American Civil War generals (Union)
- Forty-Eighters
- German Americans in the Civil War
- German American
- German-American Heritage Foundation of the USA
- List of United States senators born outside the United States
- Letter from Carl Schurz to Abraham Lincoln, November 8, 1862.

== Notes ==
Diplomatic posts
| Preceded by William Preston | United States Minister to Spain; 1861 | Succeeded by Gustav Körner |
U.S. Senate
| Preceded by John B. Henderson | U.S. Senator (Class 1) from Missouri; 1869–1875; Served alongside: Charles D. Drake, Daniel T. Jewett, Francis Blair, Lewis V. Bogy | Succeeded by Francis Cockrell |
Political offices
| Preceded by Zachariah Chandler | United States Secretary of the Interior; 1877–1881 | Succeeded by Samuel J. Kirkwood |
