= Karl Otto Weber =

German surgeon and pathologist

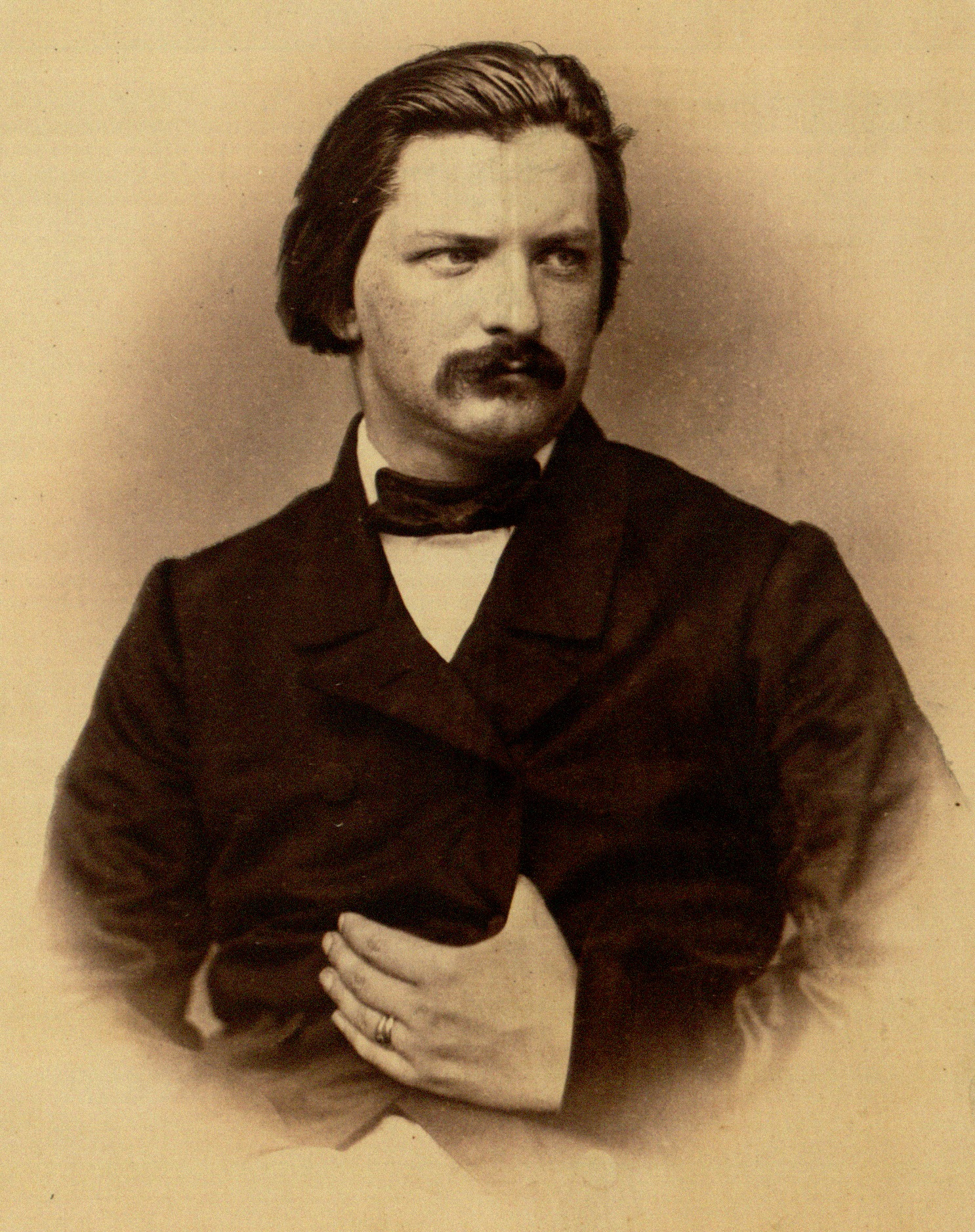
- Born: 29 December 1827; Frankfurt, Kingdom of Prussia
- Died: 11 June 1867 (aged 39); Heidelberg, Kingdom of Prussia
- Education: University of Bonn
- Medical career
- Profession: Doctor
- Field: Pathology; Surgery
- Institutions: Heidelberg University; University of Bonn

Karl Otto Weber (29 December 1827 – 11 June 1867) was a German surgeon and pathologist born in Frankfurt am Main.

== Biography ==
He received his early education in the gymnasium at Bremen which his father directed. There Weber showed a special interest in the natural sciences, and in 1846, when he went on to the University of Bonn, he studied botany, geology and mineralogy with an emphasis on paleontological botany. As a student at Bonn, he was a member of the Burschenschaft Franconia, which at that time also included Carl Schurz, Johannes Overbeck, Julius Schmidt, Friedrich Spielhagen, Ludwig Meyer and Adolf Strodtmann. In 1851, he received a degree of doctor of medicine and surgery from Bonn. After passing his state exam in 1852, he left for a study trip, most of which was spent in Paris.

In the winter of 1852/53, he became an assistant doctor in the Bonn surgery clinic of Karl Wilhelm Wutzer. Weber remained there for a full four years. During the last part of his stay, he enjoyed a large degree of independence due to the failing eyesight of Wutzer. By 1853, Weber was a Privatdocent in surgery, and zealously pursuing studies in pathological anatomy. After Wutzer retired in 1855, Wutzer's place was taken by Busch in 1856 and Weber assisted him for a year. The faculty of Bonn recommended that Weber devote himself to a specialization in pathological anatomy which at that point was not represented among their specialties, and in 1857 he was named extraordinary professor in that specialty, becoming an ordinary professor in 1862.

In 1865, Weber became professor of surgery at the University of Heidelberg. There he vigorously involved himself in the construction of a hospital in Heidelberg-Bergheim. He died in Heidelberg at the age of 39 from diphtheria.

As a pathological anatomist, Weber specialized in the fields of histology and histogenesis.

== Works ==
Weber was diligent about writing up the results of his studies. He was also a good draftsman and did his own drawings, also taking care of their transfer to the lithographic stone. Many of his medical articles were published in Pitha and Bilroth's Handbuch der allgemeinen und speciellen Chirurgie. He was the author of the following books:

- Die Knochengeschwülste in anatomischer und praktischer Beziehung (1856)
- Chirurgische Erfahrungen und Untersuchungen (1859)

Weber also published in the areas of history and biography. In the Preußischen Jahrbüchern he published the essays: “Johannes Müller,” “Alexander von Humboldt und sein Einfluß auf die Naturwissenschaft” (Alexander von Humboldt and his influence on natural science), an obituary for Karl Wilhelm Wutzer, and also “Ueber die Anfänge der pathologische Anatomie” (On the beginnings of pathological anatomy) and “Die Bedeutung der pathologische Anatomie für die medicinische Wissenschaft und Praxis” (The significance of pathological anatomy for the theory and practice of medicine).
