= Amerika Haus =

Educational institution in West Germany and Austria

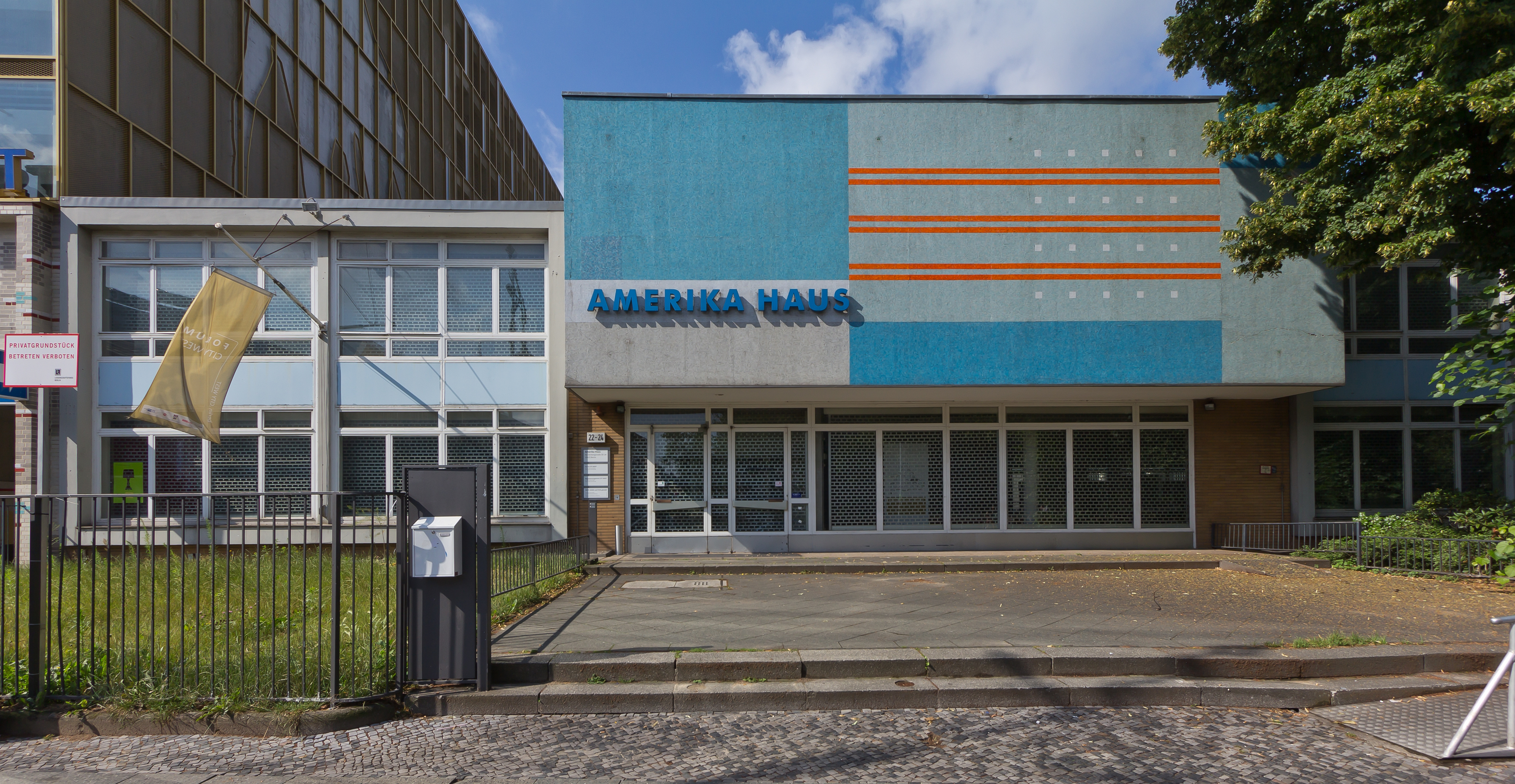
- Amerika-Haus in Berlin, 2012
- Formation: Following the end of the Second World War
- Dissolved: 2006
- Purpose: To learn more about American culture and politics, and engage in discussion and debate on the transatlantic relationship
- Location: Germany, Austria
- Owner: United States government

The America House (Amerika Haus, plural: Amerika Häuser) was an institution developed following the end of the Second World War to provide an opportunity for German and Austrian citizens to learn more about American culture and politics, and engage in discussion and debate on the transatlantic relationship. Run by the American government until 2006, Amerika Häuser were located in Frankfurt, Berlin, Heidelberg, Munich, Vienna and other cities. During the Vietnam War, German student protests in Berlin often took place in front of the America Haus.

== List of Amerika Häuser ==
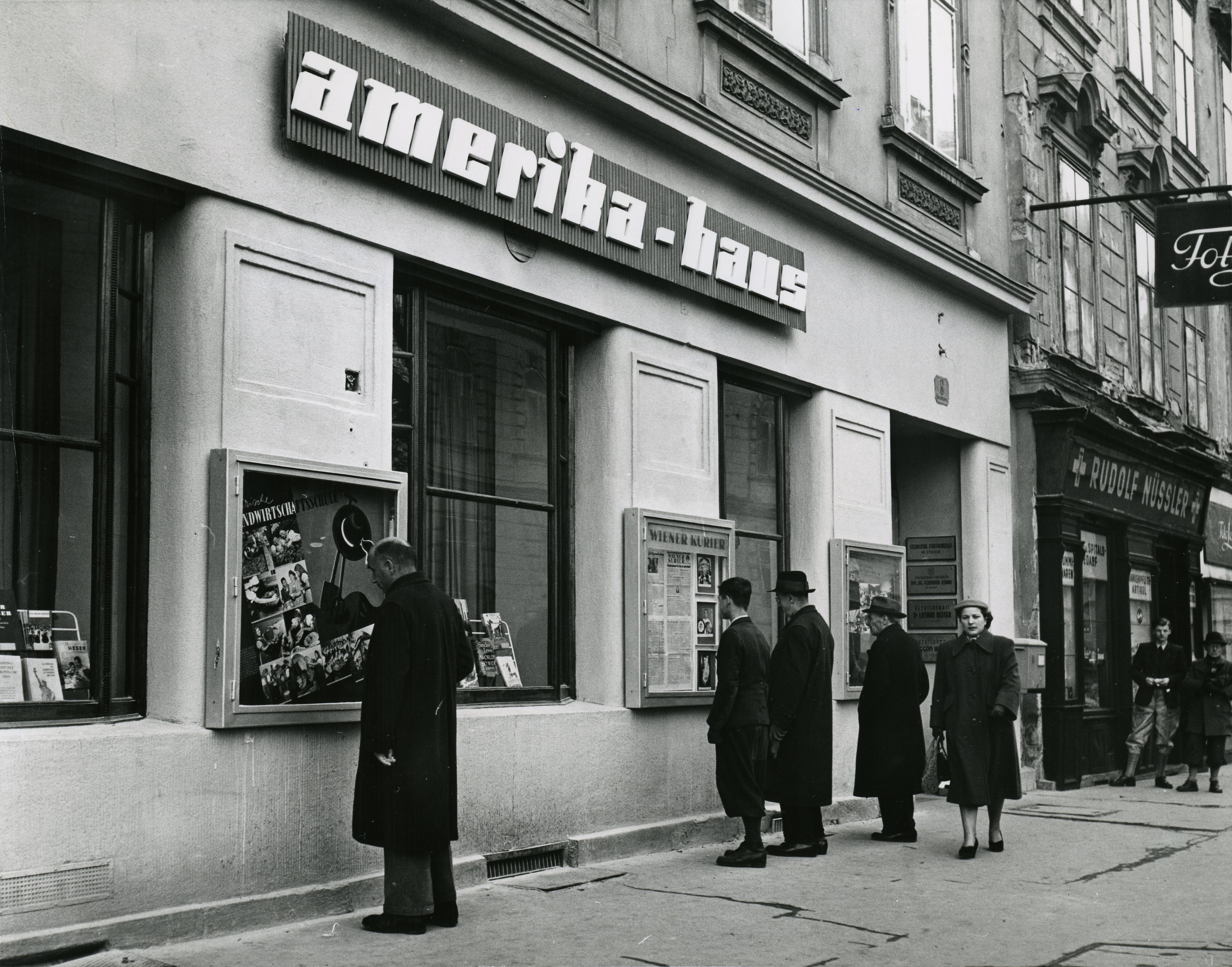
To further promote cultural ties and mutual understanding, a new Amerika Haus was opened 1952 in Graz, Austria

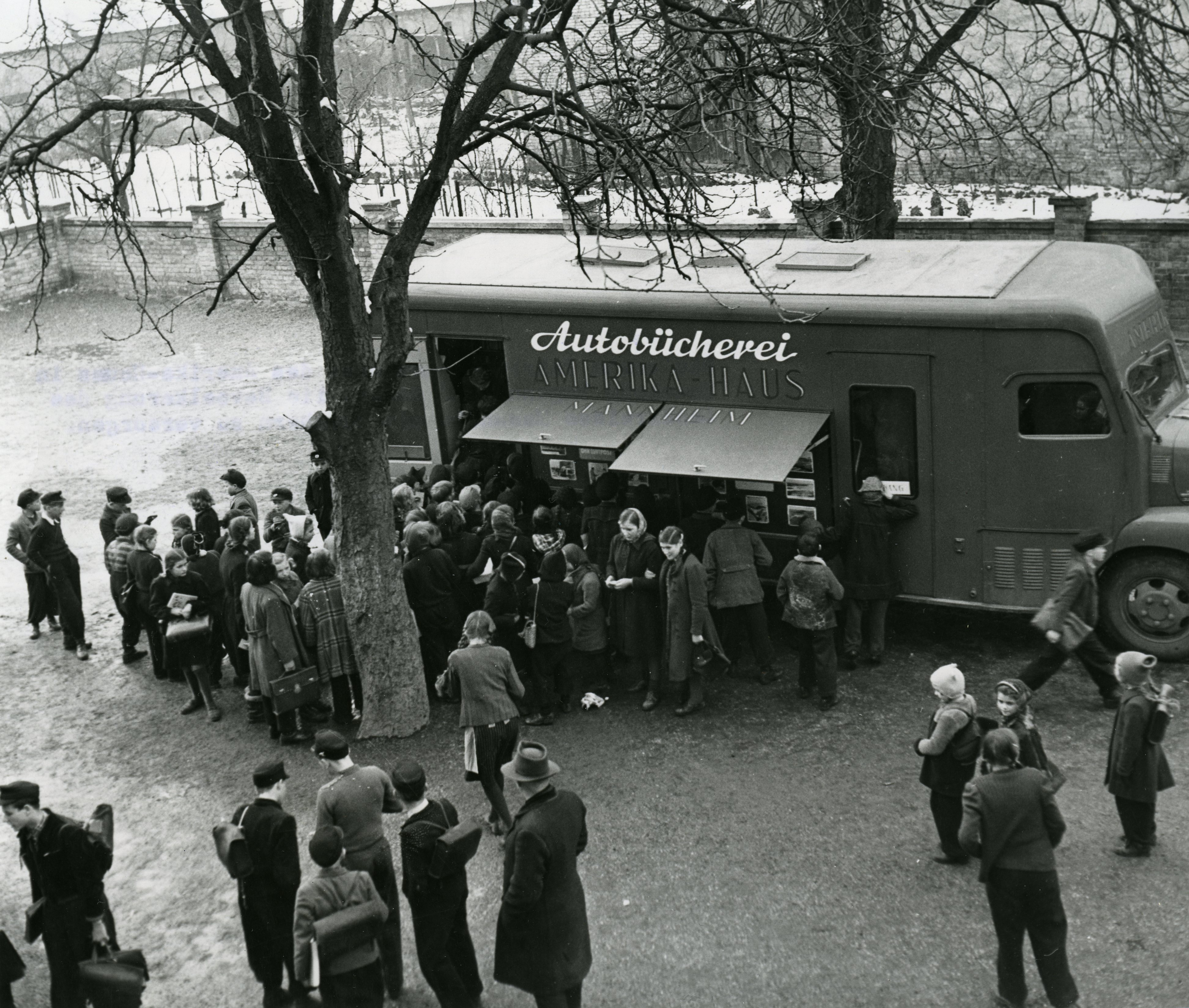
Residents Visit the Bookmobile in Mannheim, West Germany

- Amerika-Haus Frankfurt (closed in 2006)
- Amerika Haus Berlin
- Amerikahaus Wien
- Amerikazentrum Hamburg
- Amerika Haus Hannover
- Bayerisches Amerikahaus, München
- Carl-Schurz-Haus Freiburg
- Deutsch-Amerikanisches Institut Heidelberg
- Deutsch-Amerikanisches Institut Saarbrücken
- Deutsch-Amerikanisches Institut Sachsen, Leipzig
- Deutsch-Amerikanisches Institut Tübingen
- Deutsch-Amerikanisches Zentrum/James F. Byrnes Institute, Stuttgart
- German-American Institute, Nuremberg
- John F. Kennedy Haus, Darmstadt

== See also ==
- Gerhard Fauth
- Patricia van Delden
