= Deutsch-Amerikanisches Zentrum/James F. Byrnes Institute =

Coordinates: 48.7760°N 9.1815°E

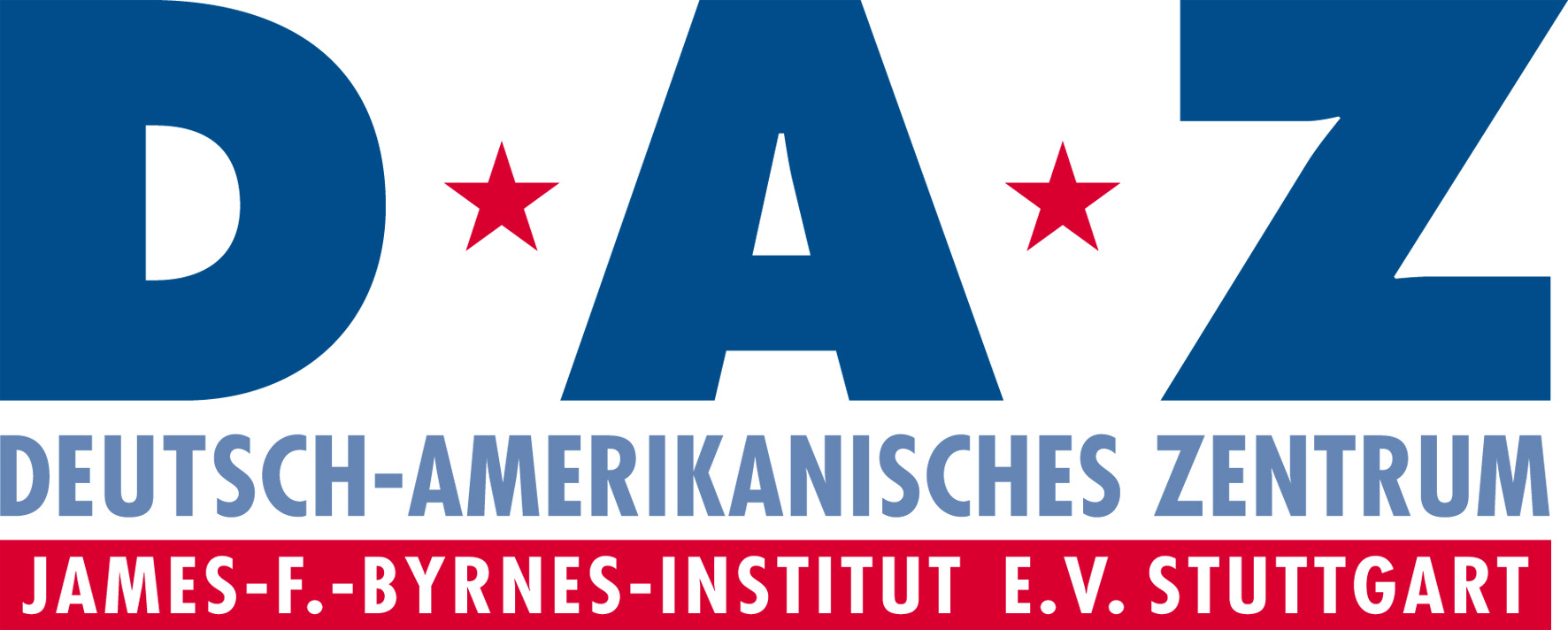
DAZ Logo

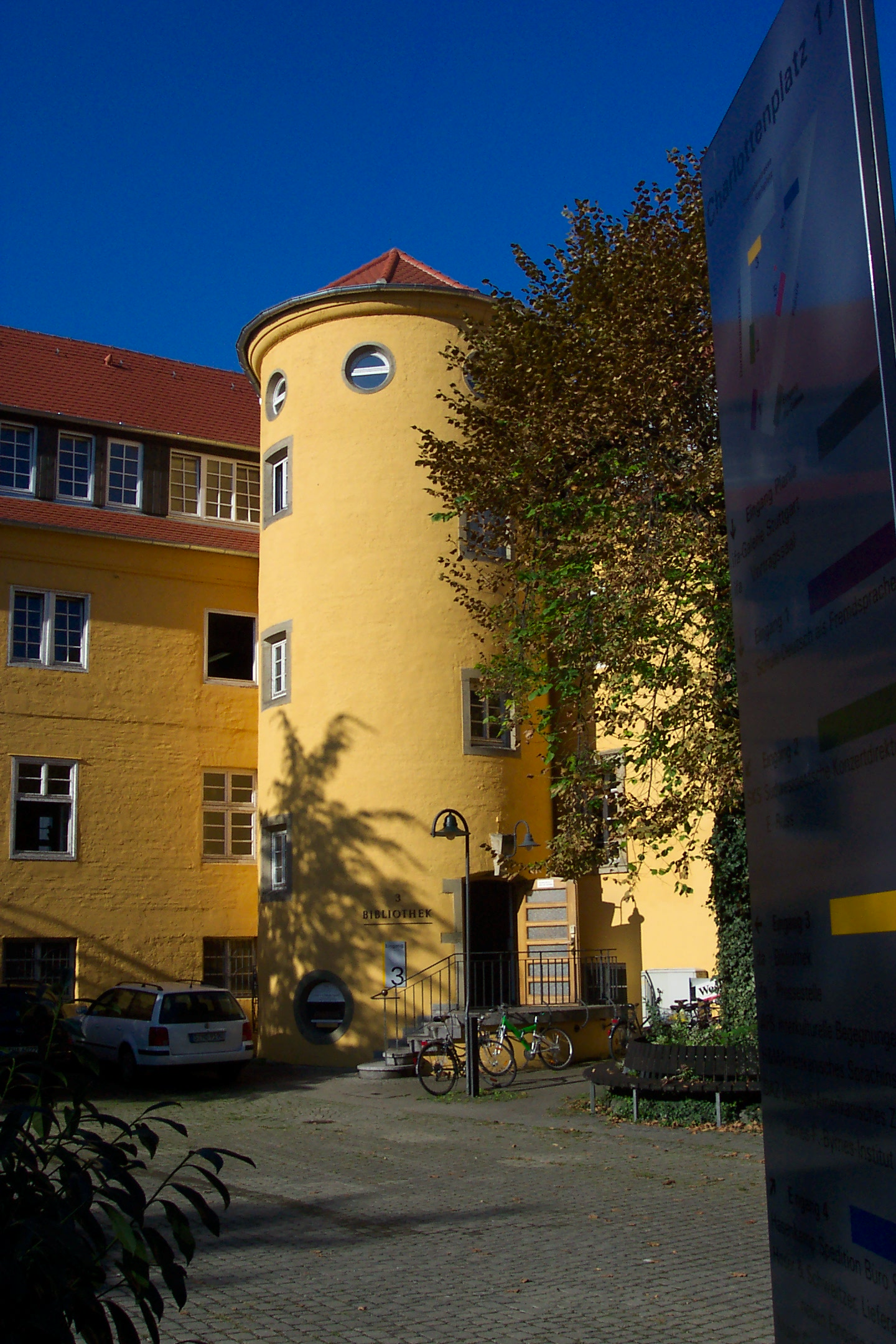
Deutsch-Amerikanisches Zentrum

The Deutsch-Amerikanisches Zentrum/James-F.-Byrnes-Institut is a non-profit, nonpartisan, cultural and educational institution in Stuttgart to support the German-American relations. The cultural institute was founded in 1995 as a successor of the Amerika Haus and intends to provide information on social, cultural, political, and economic issues in both countries.

== Structure ==
Chairman of the institute is Rudolf Böhmler. Further representatives are official institutions like the federal state of Baden-Wuerttemberg, the state capital of Stuttgart, the Universities of Hohenheim and Stuttgart, the Fachhochschulen, as well as German-American organizations, the Embassy of the United States, Berlin and corporate members. Since 2010, Christiane Pyka has been the executive director of the institute. Representatives of politics and economy form an advising board that consults the DAZ.

== Sponsors ==
The Deutsch-Amerikanisches Zentrum/James-F.-Byrnes-Institut is supported by the federal state of Baden-Wuerttemberg, the state capital of Stuttgart and the U.S. Embassy.

== Program ==
The DAZ homepage offers the opportunity to subscribe to a newsletter which informs about current DAZ events and offers.

=== Cultural Program ===
The program involves lectures, seminars and discussions in German and English, as well as musical events, films and exhibitions concerning politics, economy, history, arts and culture. They always bear reference to the US and are led by experts in science, journalism, media and economics. Furthermore, the DAZ serves as a meeting point for several German-American groups like the Empire Study Group and Transatlantic ArtConneXion, as well as the Metropolitan Club.

=== Language Program ===
Several English language courses focussing on different aspects are provided. The teachers are exclusively native speakers. The main purpose of these language courses is to get familiar with the English language and the American culture.

=== America Explained - DAZ for schools ===
In interactive lectures, US-American contributors make it possible for classes to deepen their knowledge about the USA and to get into conversation about different aspects of politics, history and culture. Also, the DAZ provides continuing education of teachers.

=== Library ===
The institute’s small library offers an extensive range of media for readers of all ages. That implies literature and magazines, journals in German and English, as well as electronic media. Besides that, the library offers free access to the database eLibrary USA.

=== USA Information ===
In cooperation with EducationUSA the DAZ provides independent information about further education and visits abroad (High School, University, Au Pair, Internships, etc. ).

=== American Days ===
The American Days is an American cultural festival in the Stuttgart Metropolitan Region. Since 2008, it has taken place annually, with the exception of 2013. Starting in 2014 it will take place biennially. During the period of at least 11 days, German and American institutions have presented a diverse program about different aspects of the transatlantic relations. The festival was established by the Deutsch-Amerikanisches Zentrum/James-F.-Byrnes-Institut in cooperation with the state of Baden-Württemberg, the capital city of Stuttgart and the Robert Bosch Stiftung in 2008. It is supposed to draw attention to existing activities and the diversity of transatlantic engagement in the Stuttgart region, as well as being a motivation for new actions and cooperations relating to the US.
