= Theodor Plievier =

German writer (1892–1955)

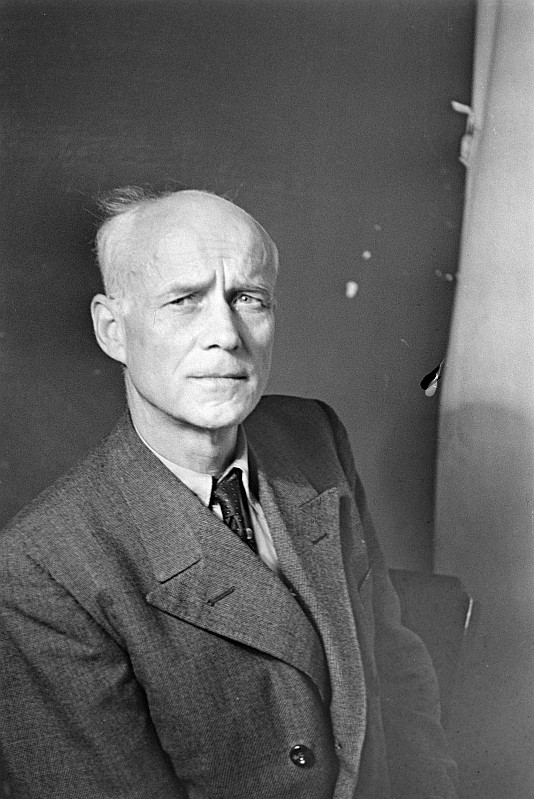
Theodor Plievier (1946).

Theodor Otto Richard Plievier (Plivier, until 1933) (12 February 1892, Berlin – 12 March 1955, Avegno, Switzerland) was a German writer best known for his 1948 anti-war novel Stalingrad.

During World War I, he served on the SMS Wolf. After the war, he released his first novel, Des Kaisers Kulis (The Kaiser's Coolies), about his experiences on board the ship. It would later be adapted into a stageplay, and was banned after the Nazi Machtergreifung.

His experiences in war form the basis of his documentary novel Stalingrad.

A television version of Stalingrad was produced by NDR in West Germany, and first shown on 31 January 1963. Adapted by Klaus Hubalek and directed by Gustav Burmester, it starred Ullrich Haupt as Generalmajor Vilshofen, Wolfgang Büttner as General Gönnern, Hanns Lothar as Gnotke, and P. Walter Jacob as General Vennekohl. Hubalek's screenplay was subsequently translated into English and directed by Rudolph Cartier for the BBC's Festival series, first shown on 4 December 1963. This version starred Albert Lieven as Vilshofen, Peter Vaughan as Gonnern, André van Gyseghem as Vennekohl, and Harry Fowler as Gnotke.

== Works in English ==
- The Kaiser’s Coolies, translated by Margaret Green, New York, Alfred A. Knopf (1931).
- The Kaiser Goes: The Generals Remain, translated by A.W. Wheen, London, Faber and Faber (1933).
- Revolt on the Pampas, translated by Charles Ashleigh, London, Michael Joseph (1937).
- Stalingrad, translated by Richard and Clara Winston, New York, Appleton-Century-Crofts (1948).
- Stalingrad, translated by Richard and Clara Winston, London, Athenaeum (1948).
- The World's Last Corner, translated by Robert Pick, New York, Appleton-Century-Crofts (1951).
- Moscow, translated by Stuart Hood, London, Frederick Muller (1953).
- Moscow, translated by Stuart Hood, New York, Doubleday (1954).
- Berlin, translated by Louis Hagen and Vivian Milroy, London, Hammond, Hammond & Co. (1956).
- Berlin, translated by Louis Hagen and Vivian Milroy, New York, Doubleday (1957).

== See also ==
- Gerhard Fauth
