= Gerhard Fauth =

German journalist

- Born: 9 April 1915; Dresden
- Died: 6 November 2003 (aged 88)
- Occupation: Journalist, screenwriter

Gerhard Walter Fauth (April 19, 1915 – November 6, 2003) was a German journalist.

== Life and work ==
Fauth was born in Dresden. As a school student, he gravitated to left-wing socialist circles close to the Socialist Workers' Party of Germany. In summer 1933, shortly before he was to take his school graduating exams, he was arrested after it was found he had written to a French friend about Hitler's new government, describing it as a "band of criminals" and warning that Hitler was preparing for war. In winter 1933, the case against him was struck down. On his release, he fled to Prague, but then returned to his parents in Germany.

During World War II, he served in Greece in the 999th Light Afrika Division, a penal battalion, becoming a lieutenant. In December 1943, he received word that a member of the battalion, Falk Harnack, was to be arrested on order of the Gestapo for his connections to the White Rose through Lilo Ramdohr. Fauth informed Harnack and helped him escape by truck to Athens. In 1944, Fauth saved a group of Greek partisans about to be shot by the SS, by getting them assigned to his Wehrmacht battalion as forced laborers to work on telephone repairs that he insisted were urgently needed. In 1945, with the Germans losing the war and in retreat, Fauth was given the order to blow up several dams, but did not carry out his orders, saving important facilities in Athens. At the end of the war, Fauth was taken prisoner of war and sent to Yugoslavia. After his release, his friend Erich Wollenberg offered him work in the administration of the Soviet occupation zone, but Fauth declined.

He moved to Munich and worked as a journalist at different newspapers including Echo der Woche and wrote freelance. In 1948, he published a book called Ruf an die deutsche Jugend (Verlag der Zwölf), which extensively detailed the First International Youth Rally in Munich from June 28 – July 4, 1947. Fauth, Alois Johannes Lippl and Harry Wilde were involved in the events.

In 1950, Fauth was invited to be an adviser for youth activities on a trip to the United States to study abroad within the framework of a cultural exchange program with Bavaria. In August 1953, Fauth published an article about child rearing, Kritik der staatsbürgerlichen Erziehung in Deutsche Jugend, the publication of the Deutscher Bundesjugendring.

In 1959, Fauth and Karl Otmar von Aretin published a booklet for the new Bavarian Landeszentrale für politische Bildungsarbeit, Die Machtergreifung: Die Entwicklung Deutschlands zur totalitären Diktatur 1918–34 and he became the director of the Amerika Haus in Munich. In the 1950s, Fauth was a member of the German-American Friendship Association, but resigned in protest of the House Un-American Activities Committee and McCarthyism.

In the 1960s, Fauth lived in Cologne and worked for the Kölner Stadt-Anzeiger, later, around 1970, moving to a job at Deutschlandfunk, where he was the editor in the Science and Education department. In the 1970s, he worked with Dieter Thoma and Henryk M. Broder. He retired in 1980 and moved to Canada with his family, but then returned to Cologne. After the 1985 death of his friend and colleague, Wilhelm Unger, he was asked by Unger's widow to assist her in preparing his personal papers, later donated to the historical archive of the city of Cologne.

Fauth was a longtime member of the Social Democratic Party (SPD) and was active in the Lutheran church. He died in 2003 near Passau.

== Works ==
- Gerhard Fauth: Erste Internationale Jugendkundgebung. Ruf an die deutsche Jugend. Ein Bericht. Verlag der Zwölf, Munich (1948)
- Aretin, K.O. Freiherr von, und G. Fauth: Die Machtergreifung. Die Entwicklung Deutschlands zur totalitären Diktatur 1918–1934. Bayerische Landeszentrale für Heimatdienst, Munich (1959)
