= Deutsch-Amerikanisches Institut Tübingen =

German cultural institution

Coordinates: 48.518253°N 9.058206°E

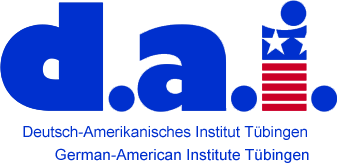

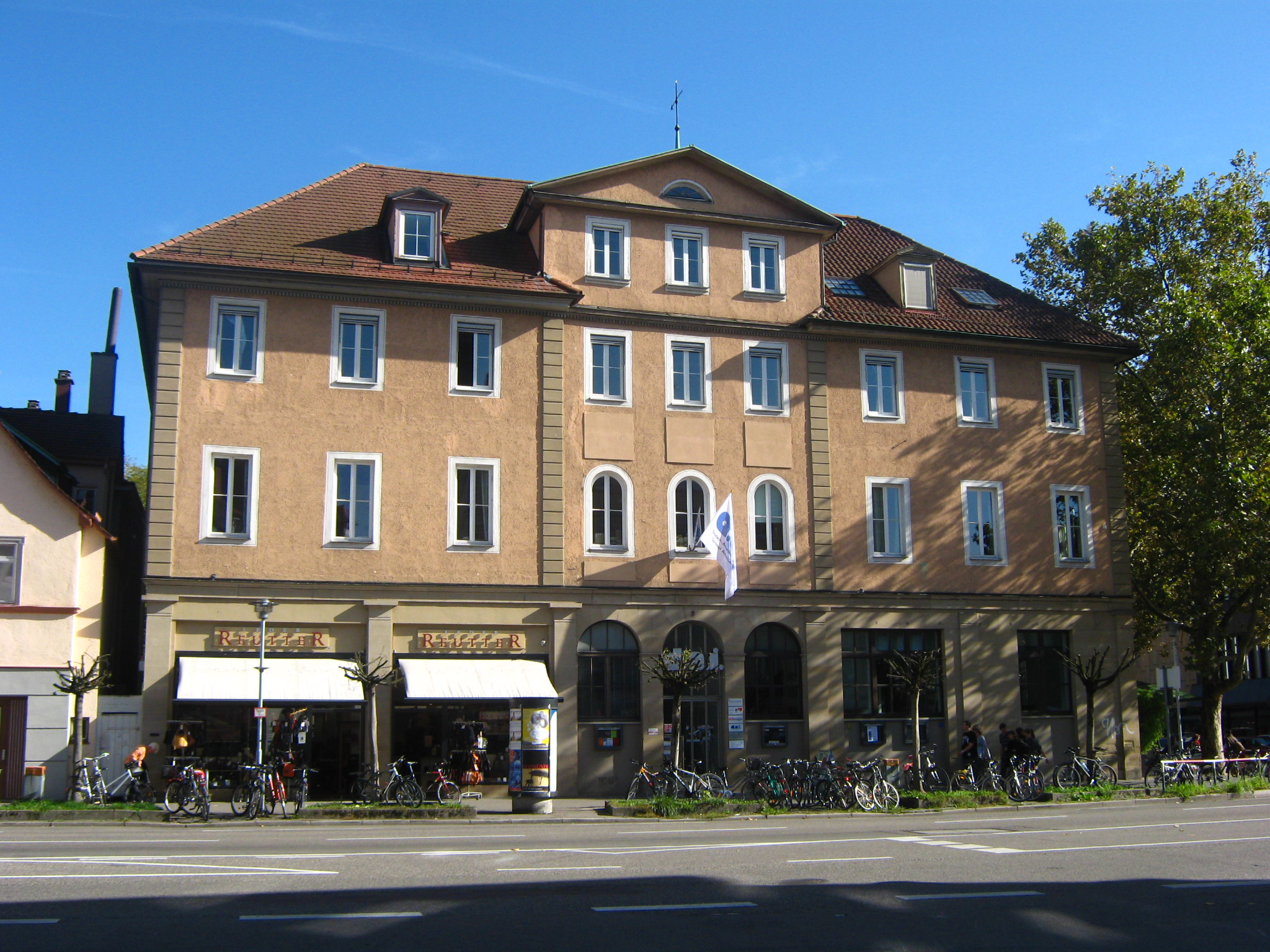

The Deutsch-Amerikanisches Institut Tübingen is a cultural institution, formerly known as the Amerika-Haus (America House).

== History ==
The first German-American Institutes or Amerikahäuser in Germany were founded in 1946, one year after the end of the Second World War. At first, they were called "U.S. Information Centers" and were basically free libraries with both American and German books and magazines, before they extended their activities to exhibitions and "lecture discussions" and until 1956 partially also served the rural areas with so-called "bookmobiles". The information centers were under the supervision of the US Army's Information Control Division, that was responsible for the "re-democratization-programs". The Information Control Division, essentially, evolved out of the Psychological Warfare Division.

The Tübingen house was created on June 20, 1952 and is thus a little older than the new Southwestern state of Baden-Württemberg. At that time, 44 of such houses existed in Germany. Fifty years later, in 2002, there were only 12 left.

== See also ==
- Amerika Haus
