= Carl-Schurz-Haus Freiburg =

Logo of the Carl-Schurz-Haus Freiburg

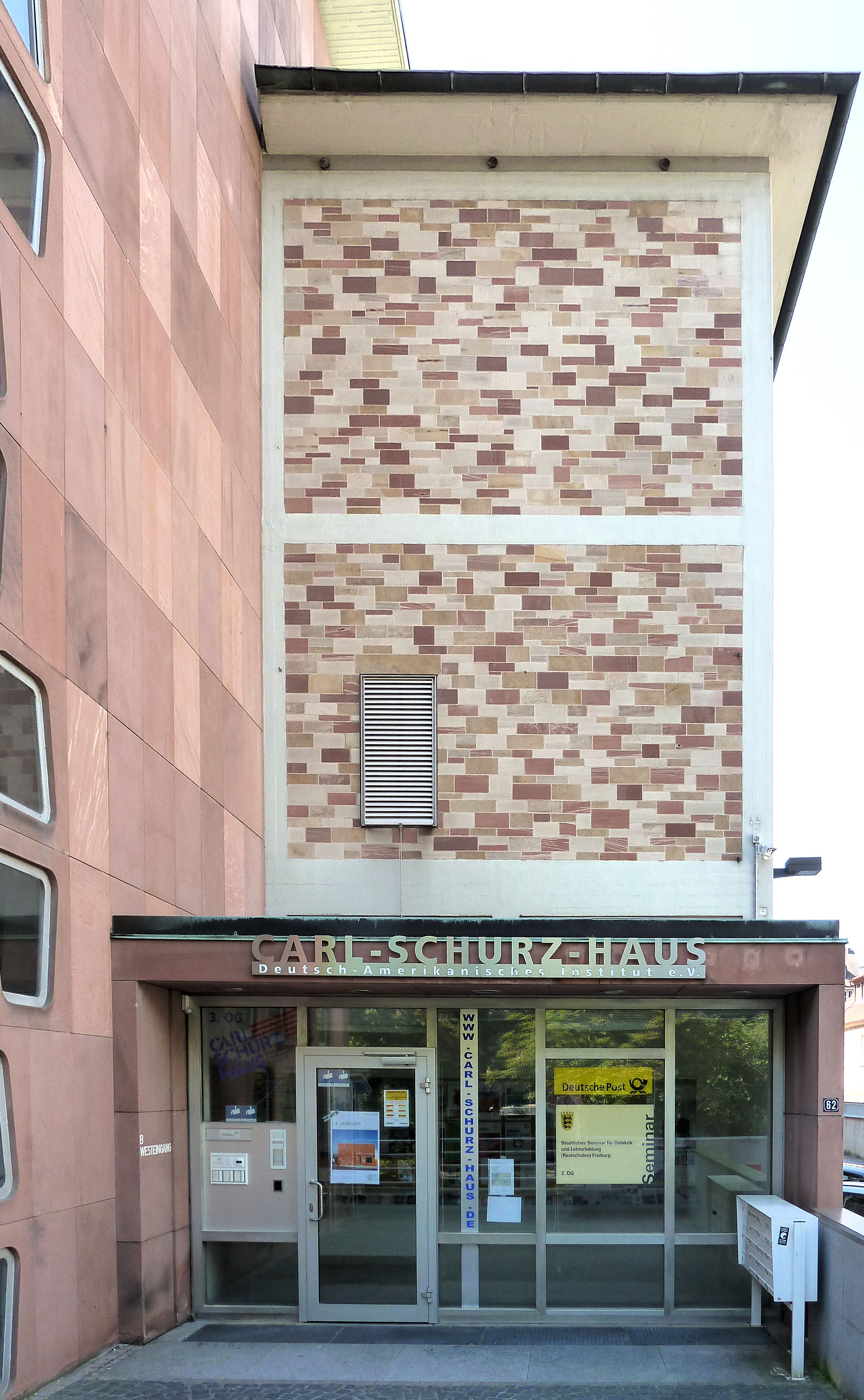
Entrance to the Carl-Schurz-Haus Freiburg

The Carl-Schurz-Haus, a German-American Institute, was founded in 1952 as Amerika-Haus (engl.: America-House) in Freiburg im Breisgau, Germany. It has operated since the 1960s as a binational cultural center. It annually offers about 250 events (speeches, exhibitions, workshops and readings) on transatlantic topics, at which those interested in societal exchange can engage in conversations with German and American experts and artists. In addition to offering concerts and English film series, the institute houses an American library with more than 20,000 titles as well as a student advisory service for German pupils interested in extended stays in the U.S. Carl-Schurz-Haus also organizes a diverse range of English courses, taught by native English speakers, for children, teenagers, and adults. Several organizations utilize Carl-Schurz-Haus as a meeting place, including the Freiburg-Madison-Gesellschaft, an association that supports relationships with Freiburg's sister city Madison in the U.S.; the German American Business Community in Baden; a quilting club; the writing workshop Freiburg Writers’ Group; and a square dancing club called Dreisam Swingers. At the end of 2016, members of the institute totaled about 1,660 people. Friederike Schulte has been the director of Carl-Schurz-Haus since 2010, while the chairman of the board is currently attorney-at-law Gerhard Manz.

== History ==
On October 17, 1952, the Freiburg Amerika-Haus was founded at Goetheplatz 2 as the information center of the USIA (United States Information Agency). At the time, it also served as a branch office of the US-Consulate General in Stuttgart. Three years later, the center moved downtown to Bertoldstraße 8, but a change in building ownership forced the Amerika-Haus to relocate. After the 1964 plans to move the institute into the newly rebuilt Kornhaus fell through, the Amerika-Haus found its new location at Kaiser-Joseph-Straße 266. The programming and administration departments moved into the new address in 1965, and in May 1966 a library and lecture hall were opened to the public.

In response to budget cuts in the US government, Amerika-Haus was converted in 1962 to a binational institute in order to ensure its financial security. The US Information Agency, the Federal German Government, the German state of Baden-Württemberg, and the city of Freiburg all contributed financially to the conversion. The foundation Freiburger Amerika-Haus e. V. was subsequently established. A 1969 administrative decision changed its name to “Carl-Schurz-Haus/Deutsch-Amerikanisches Institut e. V.”, commemorating the 140th birthday of Carl Schurz, the German revolutionary, emigrant and 13th US Secretary of the Interior. The institution celebrated the name change in March 1969 with a ceremonial lecture about Carl Schurz, and an exhibition on his 150th birthday again recounted his eventful life.

Financial problems arose in 1985 when the USIS budget cuts led to reduced monetary support. The German supporting groups filled the funding gap, which ensured the survival of the Carl-Schurz-Haus and established full German control of the institute. Since the founding of Freiburg and Madison, Wisconsin as sister cities in 1988, the institute has been the seat of the Freiburg-Madison-Gesellschaft.

In 1993 the administration and executive board were merged and Eva Manske began to serve as director of the Carl-Schurz-Haus. The Amerika-Haus moved again in 2006 and reopened at its new location of Eisenbahnstraße 58–62. In October 2008, Christine Gerhardt became director, but accepted a position as professor of American studies at the University of Bayreuth two years later. American studies specialist Friederike Schulte took on leadership of the Carl-Schurz-Haus as the new director in 2010.

== Library ==
The public American library in the Carl-Schurz-Haus offers more than 20,000 available items. The collection of books, eBooks, DVDs, audiobooks, 2 daily newspapers and over 50 magazines is available to library card holders. In addition, the library offers a computer workstation with internet access as well as an iPad for online research.

== Advising ==
The Carl-Schurz-Haus is a EducationUSA advising center. EducationUSA centers are sponsored by the US Department of State and provide independent information on student exchange opportunities in the US. A variety of questions about curriculum organisation, student exchanges, language trips, Work & Travel and au pair arrangements are answered in one-on-one interviews and public lectures.

== Special Events ==
Since the 2000 US Presidential Election, the Carl-Schurz-Haus has organized a Freiburg Election Night Party every four years with the Landeszentrale für politische Bildung (Regional Center for Political Education) and other partners. With live broadcasts, short talks and commentaries as well as entertainment programs and food, this is the largest and most visited event of its type in southwestern Germany. Since 2001, the Carl-Schurz-Haus and numerous partner institutes have hosted an annual Independence Day Party in the beer garden of the Ganter Brewery, an event that is often visited by the Consulate General of the United States in Frankfurt.

== Language Classes ==
Since 1975, the institute has organized English language classes which are exclusively taught by native English speakers. The spectrum of classes offered today range from classic conversation courses to individual and corporate courses, the administration of tests and certifications, and courses in intercultural skills.

In the fall of 2000, a course program designed specifically for children and teenagers was added in order to supplement students’ school English lessons. Since 2006, Academies with this same focus have taken place three times each year; these holiday camps offer intensive language courses through experiential learning for school-age children. Mayor Dieter Salomon sponsored the newly established Green Academy in 2014, which combined language acquisition with environmental awareness.

Since the 60th anniversary of the institute in 2012, teenagers can participate in the English-speaking book club The Book Stars to engage in discussions about current literature.

The Inside America program at Carl-Schurz-Haus connects schools in the region with native English speakers and students from the U.S. in order to facilitate authentic intercultural encounters. This program enables German students and Americans to actively interact with each other through classroom visits.

== Select Events ==
- 1968 Leslie A. Fiedler, American literary scholar, „Close The Gap, Cross The Border: The Case For Post-Modernism“
- 1988 Ishmael Reed, American novelist, Reading
- 1993 Kate Millett, Feminist, „Entmenschlicht. Versuch über die Praktiken der Psychiatrie“ / “Dehumanized. An Experiment on the Practices of Psychiatry”
- 1993 George McGovern, former US-Senator and presidential candidate, „Beyond the Cold War: America and the New Global Challenge“
- 1997 Carl Djerassi, Nobel Prize winner, Chemist and Author, „Von der Pille zur Feder“ / “From the Pill to the Pen”
- 1998 Chaim Potok, Author and Rabbi, „The Gates of November“ / „Novembernächte“
- 2002 Michael Ballhaus, Cinematographer, Book and Film presentation, Panel discussion
- 2005 Avi Primor, Israeli Diplomat and Ambassador in Germany (1993-1999), Speech, „Terror als Vorwand“ / “Terror as an Excuse”
- 2006 Joseph E. Stiglitz, Nobel Prize winner and economist, Speech, „Making Globalization Work: Über die Chance der Globalisierung“ / “Making Globalization Work: On the Opportunity of Globalization”
- 2009 Walter Pincus, Journalist at The Washington Post, Speech, „What Has Happened to the American Press?“
- 2009 Claus Kleber, ZDF-Moderator and Journalist, Speech, „Krieg und Medien in den USA” / “War and the Media in the USA”
- 2010 Jeremy Rifkin, American sociologist, economist, and author, Speech, „The Empathic Civilization. The Race To Global Consciousness In A World Of Crisis
- 2011 Dieter Salomon and Uwe Brandis, Symposium, "Machbare Visionen für eine lebenswerte Stadt der Zukunft” / „Feasible Visions for a Livable City of the Future“
- 2012 T.C. Boyle, Author, Reading, „When The Killing‘s Done“
- 2013 Louis Begley, Author, Reading, „Erinnerungen an eine Ehe“ / „Memories of a Marriage”
- 2013 Adam Johnson, Author und Pulitzer Prize winner, Reading, „The Orphan Master's Son“
- 2014 Tanja Hollander, Photographer, Exhibition and Speech, „Are You Really My Friend?“
- 2015 Susan Neiman, Philosopher und Director of the Einstein Forum, Reading and Discussion, „Why Grow Up?“
- 2015 Teju Cole, Author and Photographer, Reading, „Every Day Is For The Thief“
- 2015 Gary Shteyngart, Author, Reading, „Little Failure“
- 2016 Uwe Timm, Author, Speech and Discussion, „Carl Schurz: Lebenserinnerungen“ / „Carl Schurz: Memoirs”
- 2016 John Gerosa, Sales Director of Google Germany, Anke Domscheit-Berg, Publicist, u. a., Theme Day, My Digital Revolution
- 2016 Joseph E. Stiglitz, Nobel Prize winner and economist, Speech, “Europa spart sich kaputt” / “Europe is saving itself into ruins”
- 2016 John Kornblum, former U.S. Ambassador in Berlin und non-fiction writer, Speech, „Eurocalypse Now?“
- 2017 Hanya Yanagihara, Author and Editor of T: The New York Times Style Magazine, Reading, „A Little Life“
