= Ludwig Meyer =

German psychiatrist (1827–1900)

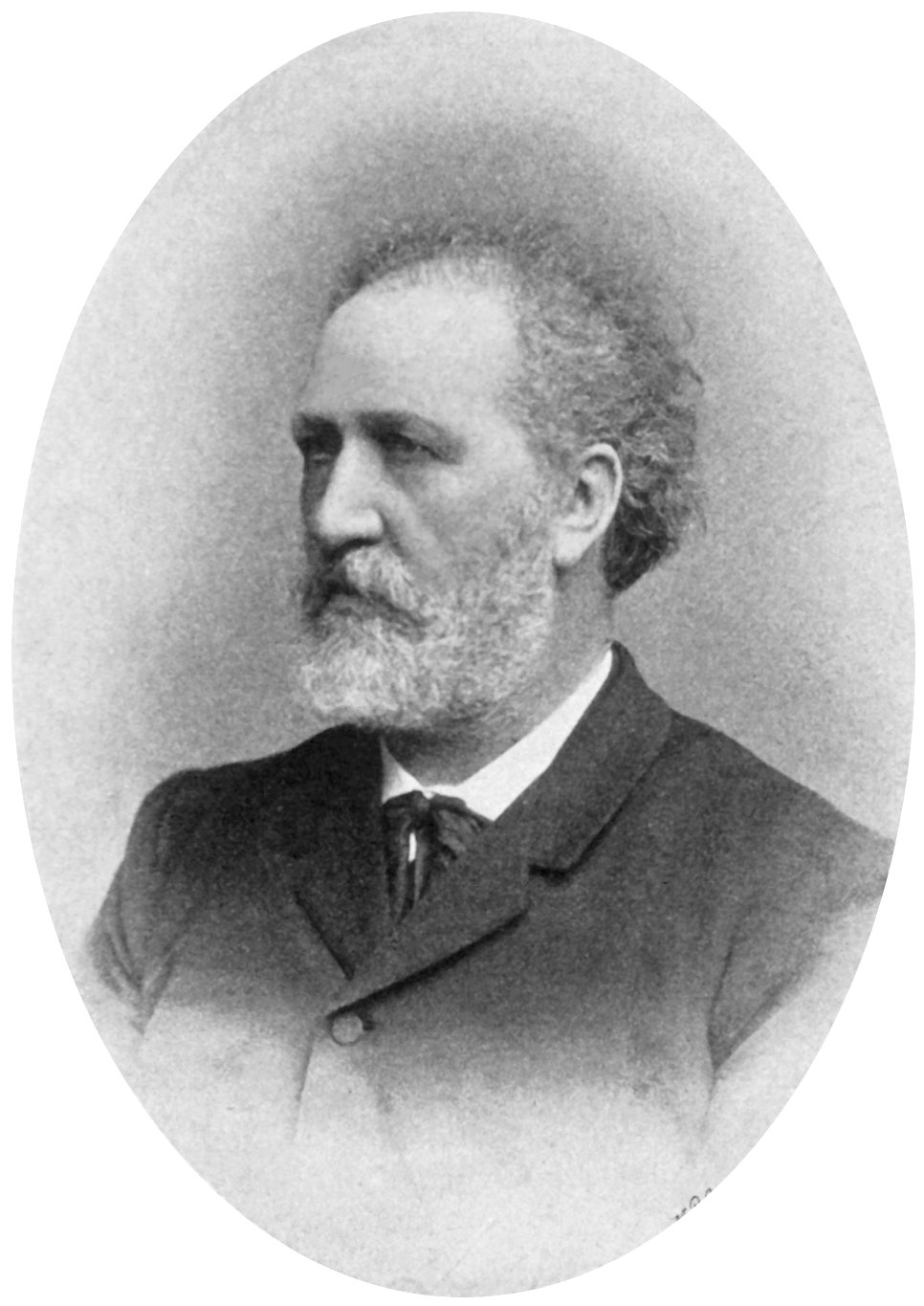
Ludwig Meyer

Ludwig Meyer (27 December 1827 – 8 February 1900) was a German psychiatrist born in Bielefeld.

In 1852 he obtained his medical doctorate from the University of Berlin, afterwards working as an assistant at Charité Hospital. Later he worked as a doctor at the insane asylum in Schwetz, and in 1856 was appointed chief physician at the city hospital in Hamburg. From 1866 until his death he was a professor of psychiatry at the University of Göttingen, as well as director of the mental institution associated with the university.

Meyer was a pioneer of no-restraint policy in German mental institutions, and is remembered for his innovative work performed in mental hospital administration. He published over 100 articles in medical journals, including influential works such as Das No-restraint und die deutsche Psychiatrie (The "no-restraint" policy and German psychiatry) and Studien zur forensischen Psychiatrie, speziell zur geminderten Zurechnungsfähigkeit (Studies of forensic psychiatry, especially for impaired mental capacity).

Meyer performed important research on the inflammatory nature of brain changes in general paresis. Also, he is credited for introducing the standard modern concept of prognathism. In 1867, with Wilhelm Griesinger (1817–1868), he founded the Archiv für Psychiatrie und Nervenkrankheiten.
