= Adolf Strodtmann =

German poet, journalist, translator and literary historian

Adolf Heinrich Strodtmann (24 March 1829, in Flensburg, Duchy of Schleswig, Denmark – 17 March 1879, in Steglitz) was a German poet, journalist, translator and literary historian. He wrote an early biography of Heinrich Heine and emigrated to the United States for a time.

== Biography ==
He had a peripatetic youth, learning the classics in four gymnasiums. Although this was not conducive to learning the classics, it had the benefit of showing him things from several points of view and taught him the Danish language well. In 1848 he participated, on the side of the Germans, in the First Schleswig War. He was severely wounded and spent some time in Copenhagen harbor on the prison ship “Dronning Maria.” On being set at liberty, he published Lieder eines Gefangenen auf der Dronning Maria (Songs of a prisoner of the “Dronning Maria”, 1848). Strodtmann then became a student at the University of Bonn where he especially became devoted to Gottfried Kinkel; however, after a short time, he was suspended because of his political activities. He then published Lieder der Nacht (Songs of the Night, 1850) and a biography of Gottfried Kinkel (1850).

He went to Paris, to London, and in 1852, he sailed for America, and with help from his father, the not-very-practical ex-student entered the book trade in Philadelphia, buying, selling and lending, as well as publishing a literary magazine called Die Locomotive. The business was not successful and closed in 1854, after which he traveled around the country pursuing literary interests, eventually settling in New York City. Weary of his various efforts to make a living, he returned to Germany in 1856, becoming a citizen of Hamburg. He covered the Franco-Prussian War for several newspapers, and in 1871, he moved to a suburb of Berlin where he lived for the rest of his life.

The beginning of his writing career was mostly devoted to composing poetry, but as he became older and less revolutionary, he devoted more time to translation (into German) and literary history. He is most noticed as an early biographer of Heinrich Heine and a compiler of his work. He published the correspondence of the poet Bürger. He translated three works from French, but mostly concentrated on Danish and English which he knew better. A noteworthy example of his translations from English is his Amerikanische Anthologie of 1870.
