= Olshausen =

Olshausen is a surname. Notable people with the surname include:

- Hermann Olshausen (1796–1839), German theologian
- Justus Olshausen (1800–1882), German orientalist
- Theodor Olshausen (1802–1869), German author, journalist, and politician
