= Ohlhausen =

Ohlhausen and Olnhausen and are German surnames. The name has several variations but the origins are one of the oldest in Europe and can be traced to 186CE to its first mention in the Franco-Roman Census found near Jagsthausen. The ancient hamlet of Olnhausen, Germany near Heilbronn still exists.

The name's meaning is "house of eel". Several Ohlhausen families crest bears a house and eels. "Ael", "ahl", and "ohl" are all Germanic etymological variations of the English word "eel".

Variations of the name include Olshausen, Ohlhaussen, Olhausen, Aelhausen, etc.

== People ==
- Mary Phinney von Olnhausen (1818–1902), Civil War nurse, whose exploits during the American Civil War were chronicled in "Adventures of an Army Nurse in Two Wars: Baroness von Olnhausen"
- Maureen Ohlhausen, attorney and Federal Trade Commissioner appointed by Barack Obama

== See also ==
- Ohlhauser
