= Carl Daenzer =

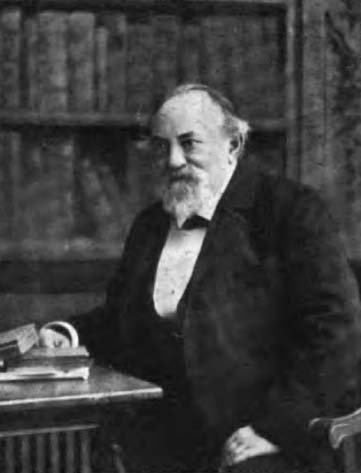
- Born: July 17, 1820; Odenheim
- Died: September 23, 1906; Neckarsulm
- Monuments: Naked Truth Statue, St. Louis
- Other name: Karl August Dänzer
- Education: Dr. iur.
- Occupations: Politician; newspaper editor

Carl Daenzer [In Germany, Karl] (July 17, 1820, in Odenheim – September 23, 1906, in Neckarsulm) founded the Westliche Post and was a long-time editor of the Anzeiger des Westens, two noted German-language newspapers in St. Louis, Missouri. He and Emil Preetorius were the Nestors of the German American press in the United States.

In the Revolutions of 1848 in Germany, Daenzer had made himself obnoxious to the German government with efforts to bring about German unity by force of arms. For his rebellious course, he was condemned to ten years imprisonment with a heavy fine. He escaped to Switzerland, and thence to the United States.

In 1851, he drifted into St. Louis as a general writer and was hired by Henry Boernstein as editor for the Anzeiger des Westens, of which Boernstein had recently become proprietor. Daenzer edited the paper until 1857 when, due to differences of various kinds which had arisen with Boernstein, he resigned.

With the aid of friends, Daenzer started the Westliche Post, which would be a vigorous competitor with the Anzeiger for several decades to come. The initial investment was comparatively small, $1,275, but the paper paid its way from the beginning. It did business under the firm name of Daenzer & Wenzel. Wenzel sold his part in 1859, and Daenzer left the paper in 1860 for health reasons.

In 1870 [Franco-Prussian War] he collected more than one million Dollars for wounded German soldiers. In 1885 President Cleveland asked him as US-ambassador to Bern (Suisse). But he refused.

When Daenzer returned to St. Louis in 1862 after having left for Europe in 1860, he found that the Anzeiger had gone out of business. He resuscitated the old concern under the name of the Neue Anzeiger des Westens, for the publication of which a company was incorporated, including William Palm, Charles Speck and others. After a time, the word "Neue" (new) was dropped. Although in the main supporting Democratic measures, the chief quality of the Anzeiger' was its complete independence.

On June 1, 1898, the Anzeiger des Westens was consolidated with the Westliche Post, and Daenzer retired. He spent his retirement years in Germany.

== Legacy ==
A statue, Naked Truth, was dedicated in St. Louis at the Compton Hill Reservoir Park at the intersection of South Grand Boulevard and Russell Boulevard, in memory of Daenzer and two others who worked on the Westliche Post, Carl Schurz and Emil Preetorius.

In 1870, a Carl Daenzer, perhaps the same person, released 20 Eurasian tree sparrows from Germany into Lafayette Park in St. Louis. A similar introduction of the house sparrow in Boston sometime around the 1870s led to what ornithologists refer to as "The Sparrow War" between Thomas Brewer and Elliott Coues, when the non-native species began multiplying more prodigiously than expected.
