= Silesian weavers' uprising =

1844 labor dispute

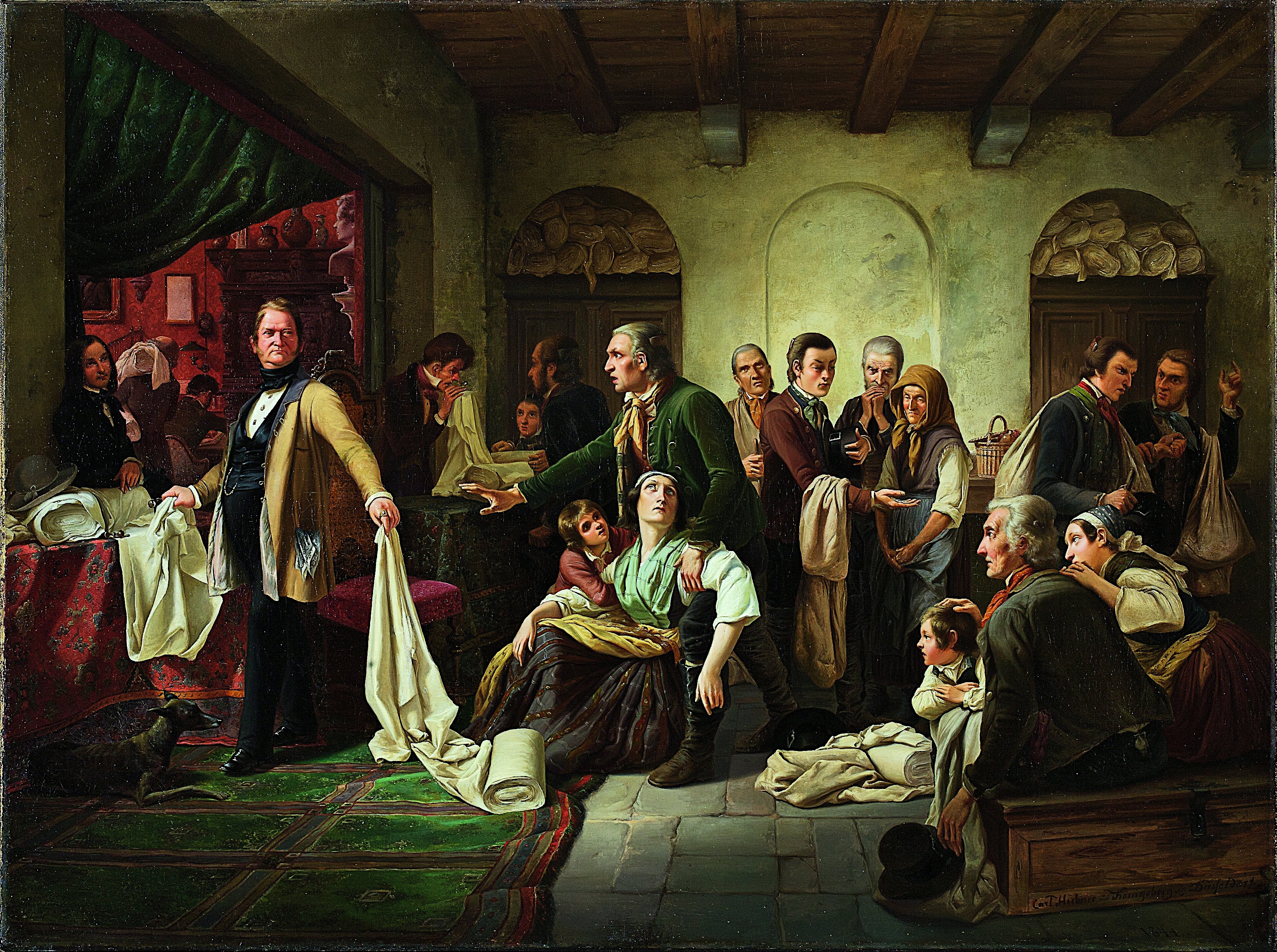
The Silesian weavers by Karl Hübner

Silesian weavers' uprising of 1844 (German: Schlesischer Weberaufstand, Polish: Powstanie tkaczy śląskich) or Owl Mountains weavers' uprising (Polish: Powstanie tkaczy sowiogórskich) was a revolt against contractors who supplied the weavers of Lower Silesia with raw material and gave them orders for finished textiles but drastically reduced their payments.

Silesia's industry was in bad condition in the decades after 1815. Silesian linen weavers suffered under Prussia's free trade policy and British competitors that already used machines destroyed the competitiveness of Silesian linen. The situation worsened after Russia imposed an import embargo and the Silesian linen industry began to mechanize. In several towns this traditional craft died out altogether, costing many linen weavers their profession.

As social conditions worsened, growing unrest culminated in the Silesian cotton weavers' uprising of 1844. This uprising, on the eve of the revolution of 1848, was closely observed by German society and treated by several artists, among them Heinrich Heine (with his 1844 poem Die schlesischen Weber) and Gerhart Hauptmann (with his 1892 play The Weavers). It also attracted extensive attention among German thinkers such as Karl Marx.

== Background ==
During the early 19th century, the Industrial Revolution began transforming the textile industry across Europe, including Silesia. The region, which had been a center for traditional handloom weaving, experienced a dramatic shift as mechanized looms were introduced. These new machines, primarily found in factories, were far more efficient than handlooms, leading to a sharp decline in demand for handwoven goods.

As a result, many hand weavers found themselves struggling to compete with the lower prices and higher output of factory-produced textiles. Those who continued working in the cottage industry were forced to accept significantly reduced wages, often insufficient to cover even basic living expenses. The economic downturn of the 1840s, known as the "Hungry Forties", further intensified these difficulties, leading to widespread poverty and discontent among the weavers.

== The uprising ==
The immediate trigger for the uprising was the refusal of factory owners to raise wages or improve working conditions despite the weavers' repeated appeals. On June 4, 1844, the unrest began in the town of Peterswaldau (now Pieszyce in Poland), where weavers gathered to demand better pay. When their demands were ignored, the weavers took to the streets, smashing machinery and looting the homes of wealthy factory owners.

The revolt quickly spread to other towns in the region, most notably Langenbielau (now Bielawa, Poland). In these towns, weavers organized themselves into groups, targeting the properties of those they viewed as responsible for their oppression.

== Repression ==
The Prussian authorities responded swiftly and harshly to the uprising. Troops were dispatched to the affected areas to restore order. On June 6, 1844, a confrontation between the weavers and the military resulted in the deaths of 11 weavers, while others were arrested and later tried.

== Aftermath and legacy ==
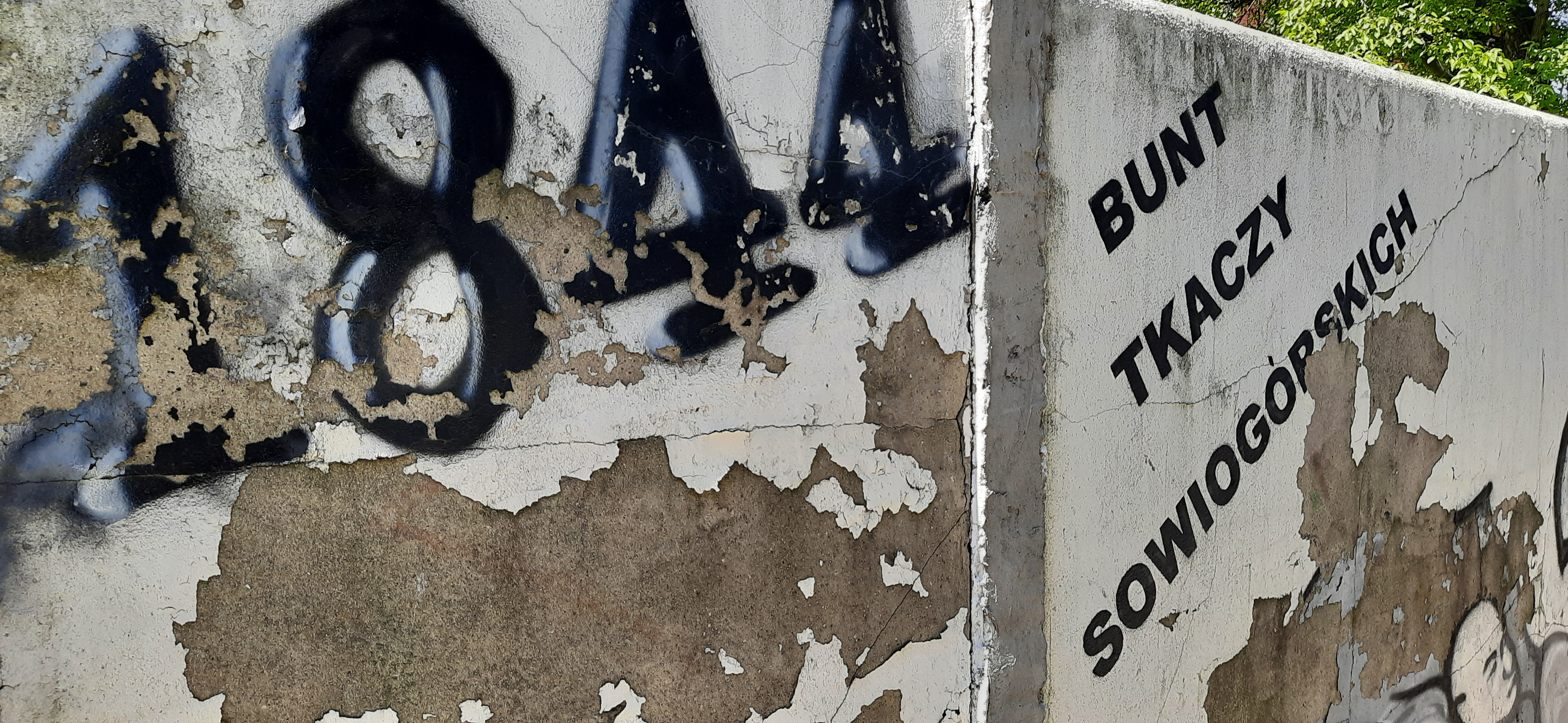
Mural commemorating the Owl Mountains weavers' uprising in Bielawa

The Silesian Weavers' Uprising was one of the first major labor revolts in the German-speaking world and is often seen as a precursor to the broader social upheavals that would culminate in the Revolutions of 1848. The revolt drew significant attention to the plight of the working class and highlighted the growing tensions between labor and capital during the early stages of industrialization.

The event also inspired literature and art, most notably the poem "Die schlesischen Weber" ("The Silesian Weavers") by the German poet Heinrich Heine, which became a symbol of social protest. The uprising is also the subject of Gerhart Hauptmann's drama The Weavers of 1892, a major work of naturalist literature.

== Account ==
The journalist Johann Friedrich Wilhelm Wolff described the events as follows:

In Silesian villages (18,000 inhabitants) cotton weaving was the most widespread occupation. There was extreme misery among the workers. The desperate need of jobs had been taken advantage by the contractors to reduce the prices of the goods they order ... On 4 June at 2 p.m. a large crowd of weavers emerged from their homes and marched in pairs up to the mansion of their contractors demanding higher wages. They were treated with scorns and threats alternatively. Consequently, a group of them forced their way into the house, smashed it's elegant window panes, furniture, porcelain ... another group broke into the storehouse and plundered it of cloth supplies which they tore to shreds ... The contractor fled with his family to a neighboring village which refused to shelter such a person. He returned 1 day later having requisitioned the army. In exchange that followed, eleven weavers were shot.

Thereafter, the Prussian government repressed them with great brutality.

== In literature ==
Heine's well-known work "The Silesian Weavers" premiered in Vorwärts!, depicting this uprising.
