= Olnhausen, Germany =

Coordinates: 49°18′53″N 9°26′38″E

Olnhausen (alternative name: Ohlhausen; historical variants: Olnhausen, Ohlhausen, Olhausen, Ohlhaussen, Ahlhausen, Aalhausen, Aalhaus) is a village in Baden-Wurttemberg with an area of 4.57 km^{2}, in the district of Heilbronn, near Jagsthausen. Olnhausen has a population of about 300.
