= Westliche Post =

German-language American newspaper (1857–1938)

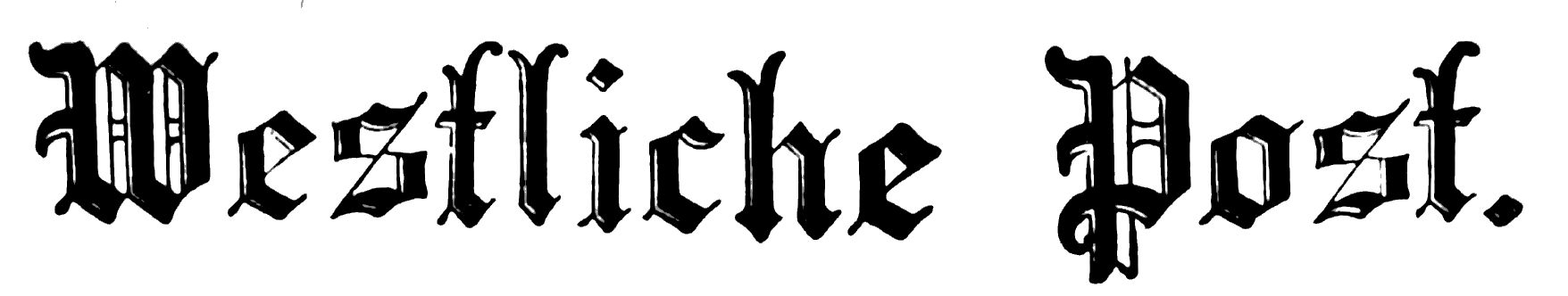

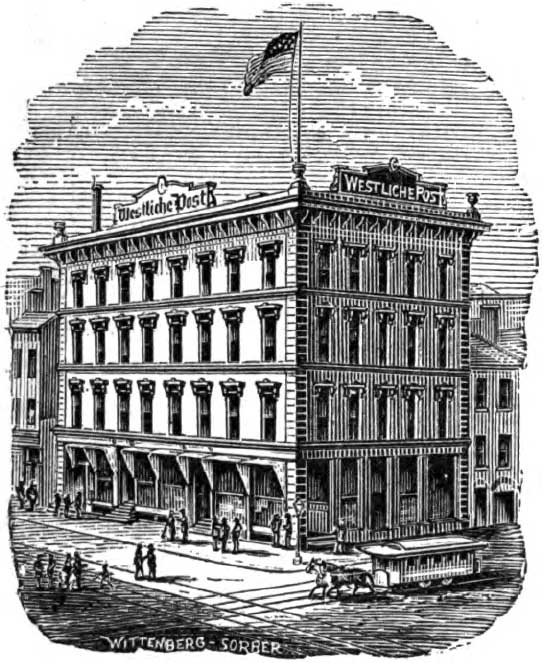
- Westliche Post Building; Fifth and Market Streets
- Type: Daily German language newspaper
- Publisher: Plate, Preetorius, Olshausen & Schurz
- Editor-in-chief: Theodor Olshausen; Emil Preetorius
- Founded: 1857
- Ceased publication: 1938
- Political alignment: Republican Party
- Language: German
- Headquarters: St. Louis, Missouri

Westliche Post (literally "Western Post") was a German-language daily newspaper published in St. Louis, Missouri, from 1857 to 1938. The Westliche Post was Republican in politics. Carl Schurz was a part owner for a time, and served as a U.S. senator from Missouri for a portion of that time.

== History ==
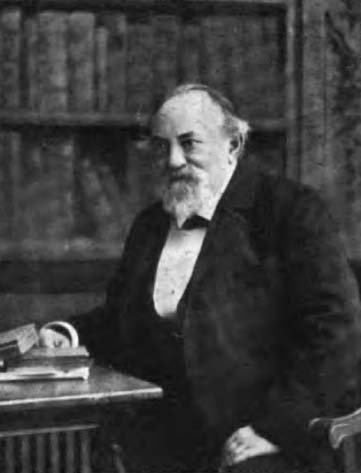
Carl Daenzer, founder

The Westliche Post was established September 27, 1857. The first publishers were Carl Daenzer, and F. Wenzel. The initial investment, supplied by Daenzer and friends, was $1,275, comparatively small, but the paper paid its way from the beginning. It did business under the firm name of Daenzer & Wenzel. Wenzel sold his part in 1859 and Carl Daenzer left the paper in 1860 for health reasons. During the Civil War, Theodore Olshausen was editor-in-chief of the Westliche Post. At the end of the war, he sold his interest in the Westliche Post and returned to Europe on account of ill health, settling in Zurich.

In April 1864, Theodore Plate became publisher and Emil Preetorius acquired an interest in the paper and became editor-in-chief. In 1867, Arthur Olshausen acquired an interest, and in May of that year Carl Schurz became a partner and an associate of Emil Preetorius in the editorial management. The publishing firm was then Plate, Preetorius, Olshausen & Schurz. Plate and Olshausen gradually disposed of much of their interest, and Preetorius and Schurz became the principal owners; it was then published under the auspices of the Westliche Post Association, Emil Preetorius, president; Felix Coste, secretary and treasurer. Schurz, still retaining a pecuniary interest, retired from the paper in 1881 and moved to New York City. In April 1874, the paper moved to a commodious and convenient building at the corner of Fifth and Market Streets, the property having been purchased May 27, 1871, for about $90,000.

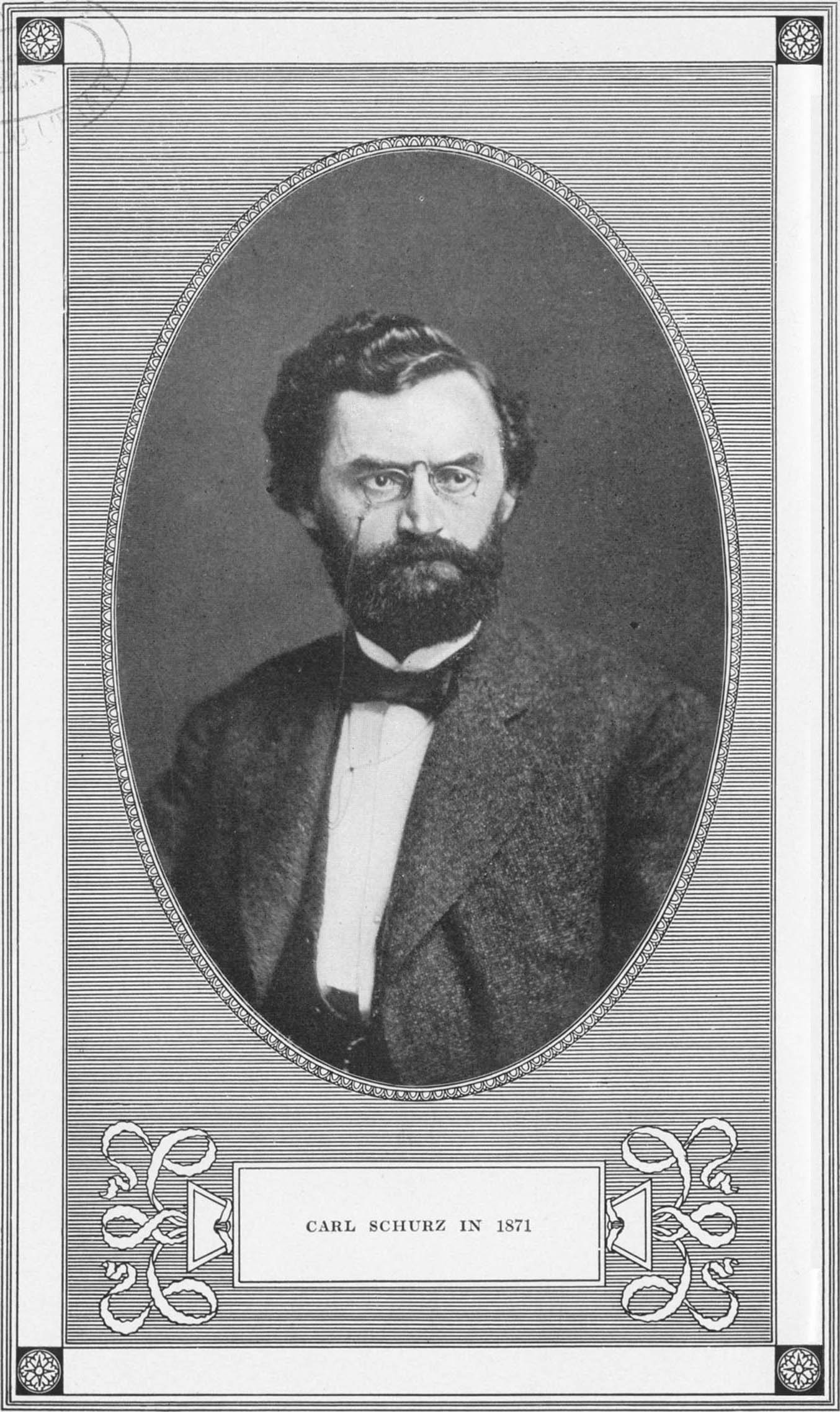
Carl Schurz, editor and stakeholder

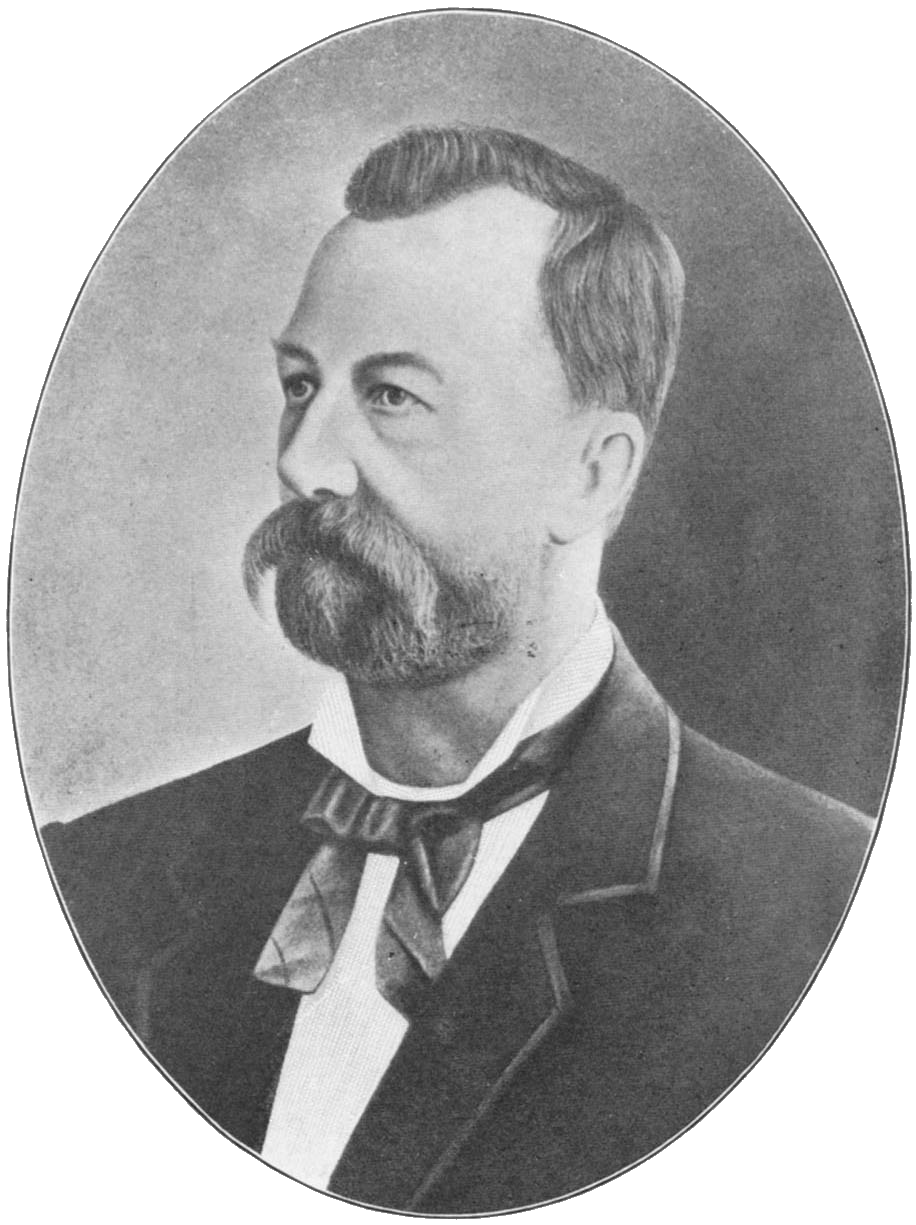
Emil Preetorius, editor and stakeholder

Among the talented contributors to the columns of the Westliche Post was William Stengel. At the close of the Civil War, he settled in St. Louis and became assistant editor of the Westliche Post, where he remained until his death. He was a well known political writer. In May 1881, Edward Leyh became a principal member of the editorial staff of the Westliche Post. As a terse, brilliant and logical writer, Leyh had no superior on the German-American press. His information on political, historical and scientific subjects was thorough and accurate. He corresponded with several of the leading papers of Berlin, including Die Gartenlaube, and did much literary work, including a translation into German of Joaquin Miller's poems. The translation was published in Berlin and had an extensive sale.

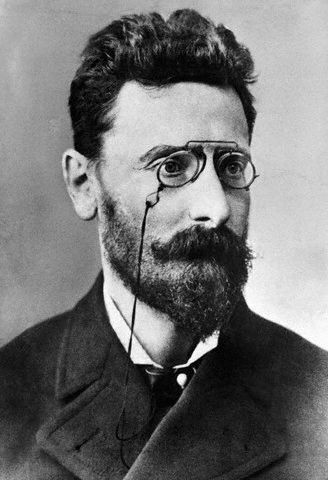
Joseph Pulitzer, editor and stakeholder

Joseph Pulitzer published his first news story in the Westliche Post and worked on it as a cub reporter. He was hired in 1867. Preetorius had noticed his skill and industry at the Mercantile Library where they both spent leisure time, and city editor Louis Willich was the recipient of many aptly chosen pieces of news which Pulitzer gathered from immigrants while working as secretary at the Deutsche Gesellschaft (German Society). After Pulitzer joined the paper, Schurz took him under his wing and showed the fledgling reporter the ropes of reporting and politics; Pulitzer rapidly won recognition. Willich left the paper in 1869, and Pulitzer took his place as city editor. In 1872, Pulitzer became one of the proprietors of the paper. Preetorius and Schurz bought him out in 1873, and he went on to other enterprises.

On June 1, 1898, the Westliche Post consolidated with the Anzeiger des Westens, which had previously absorbed the local Tribune. Preetorius and Daenzer, the latter now long-associated with the Anzeiger, both retired at this point. Under the consolidation, both papers, the Morning Westliche Post and the Evening Anzeiger, were issued by the German-American Press Association, the stockholders being Emil Preetorius, Carl Daenzer, Edwin C. Kehr, Charles Nagel and Paul F. Coste; John Schroers was business manager. The Sunday issue was called The Mississippi Blaetter (The Mississippi Leaves). The Westliche Post remained Republican in politics, and the Anzeiger des Westen remained independent. Edward L. Preetorius was prominent in the management, and the editorial corps included Carl Albrecht.

The Westliche Post was edited with marked ability, and was one of the most prosperous German papers in the United States. It apparently ceased publication in 1938.

== See also ==
- Anzeiger des Westens, the other large local daily German language paper
- Forty-Eighters
- Illinois Staats-Zeitung, the German-language daily of Chicago

== Notes ==
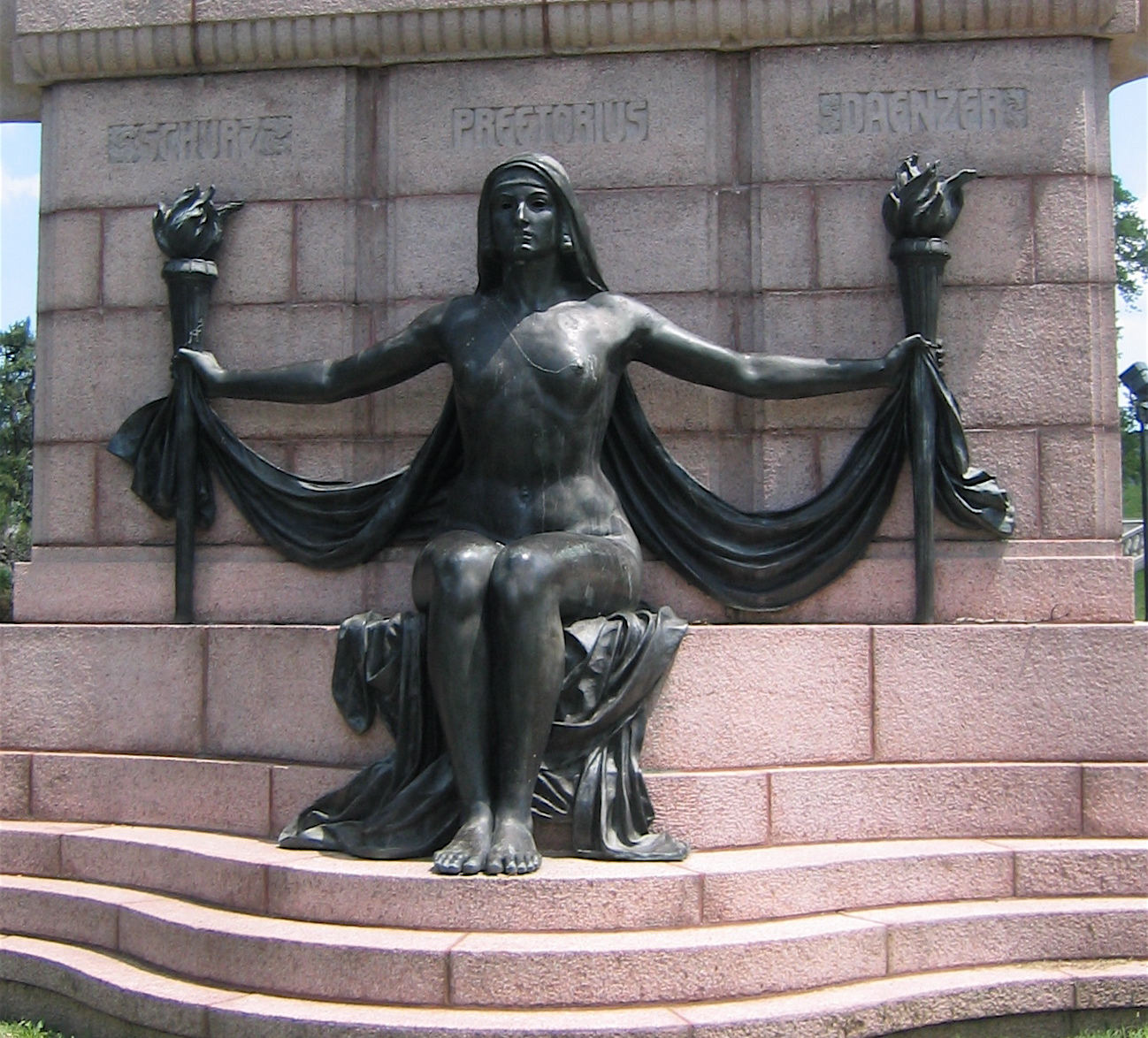
The Naked Truth, unveiled in 1914, was a gift to the city of St. Louis by the German-American Alliance in honor of Carl Schurz, Emil Preetorius and Carl Daenzer, editors of the Westliche Post.
