= Karl Hübner =

German painter (1814– 1879)

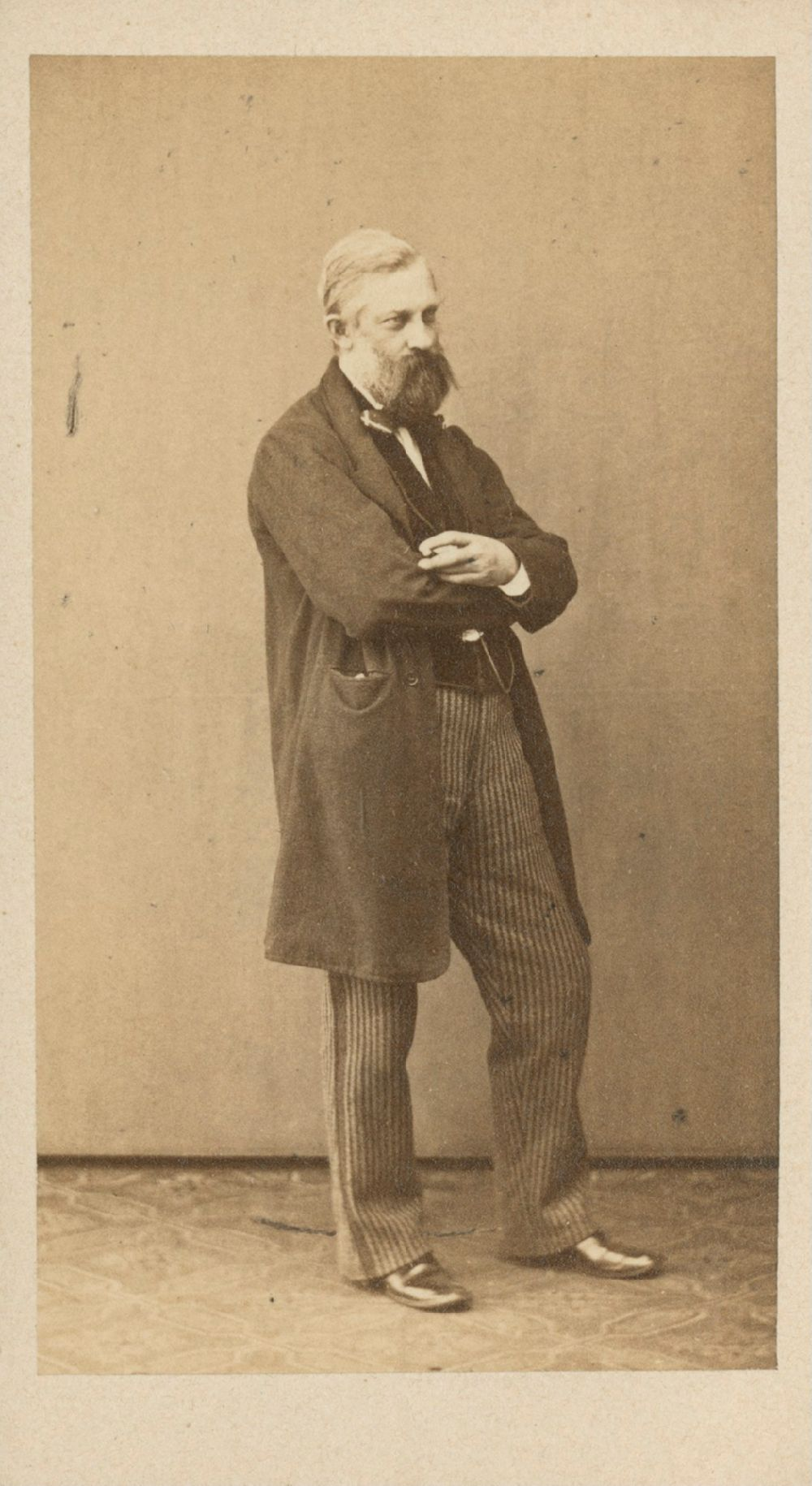
Carl Wilhelm Hübner by G. & A. Overbeck (firm), c. 1868

Karl Wilhelm Hübner (17 June 1814 – 5 December 1879) was a German landscape and genre painter, in the Romantic style.

== Life and work ==
He was born in Königsberg. His father was a construction worker. He initially studied art with the portrait painter, Johann Eduard Wolff, in his hometown. Thanks to his support, Hübner was able to gain admission to the Kunstakademie Düsseldorf in 1837. His instructors there included Wilhelm von Schadow and Karl Ferdinand Sohn.

He graduated in 1841 and established a studio in the Pempelfort district, and soon became associated with the Düsseldorfer Malerschule. There, he married Caroline Dorn. They had several children. His daughter, Maria, married the businessman Franz Georg Groll, while she was still underage. Two of his sons went to the United States. His eldest, Julius, also became a painter.

In 1844, he created his best known work: The Silesian Weavers, inspired by an uprising staged by the weavers of Silesia earlier that year; the event would also inspire Heinrich Heine to write his poem of the same name. The realist painting was shown throughout Germany. Although it was well received, some art critics complained that, by taking the side of the weavers, he was engaging in "Tendenzmalerei" (propaganda).

In 1847, he made an extensive study tour of the United States. The sketches he made formed the basis for many of his later paintings. In 1848, he was instrumental in creating a new artists' association which, upon his suggestion, was named "Malkasten" (Paintbox). He served as its Chairman for several years. He also served on the board of the Verein der Düsseldorfer Künstler, and was a member of various academies. In 1864, King Wilhelm I named him a Professor. Later, he received the Order of the Red Eagle.

Hübner died in 1879 in Düsseldorf.

== Selected paintings ==
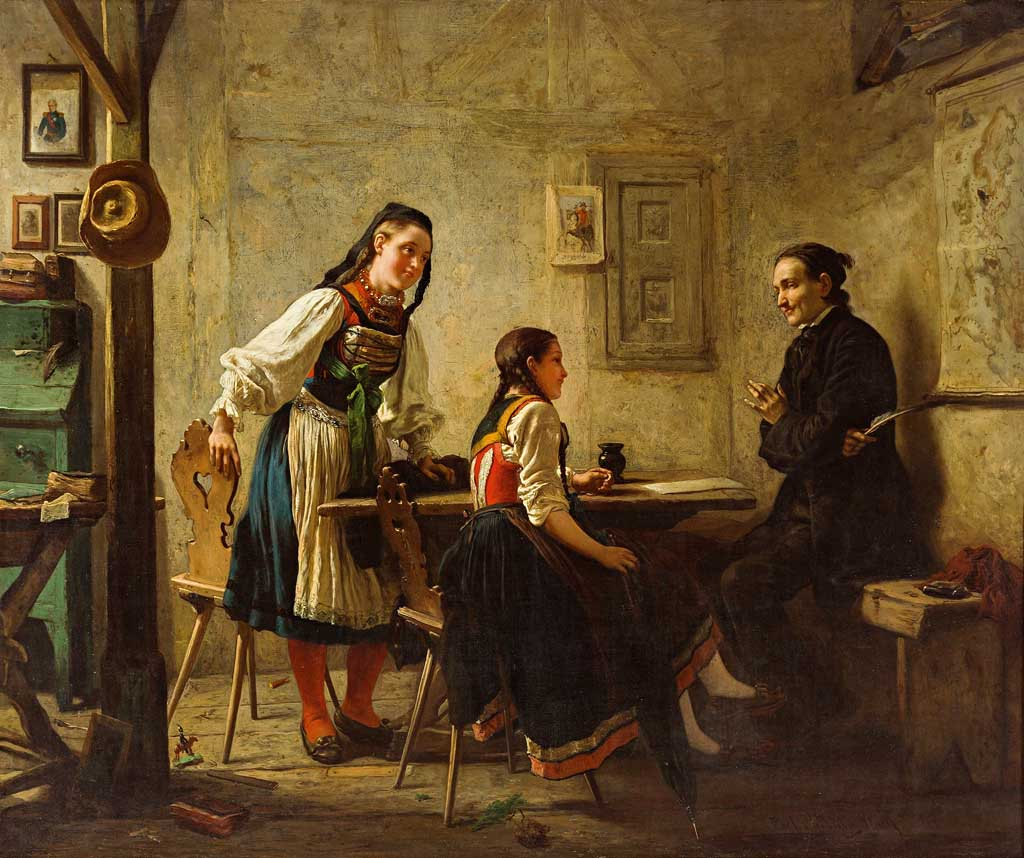
Two Young Girls in Geography Class

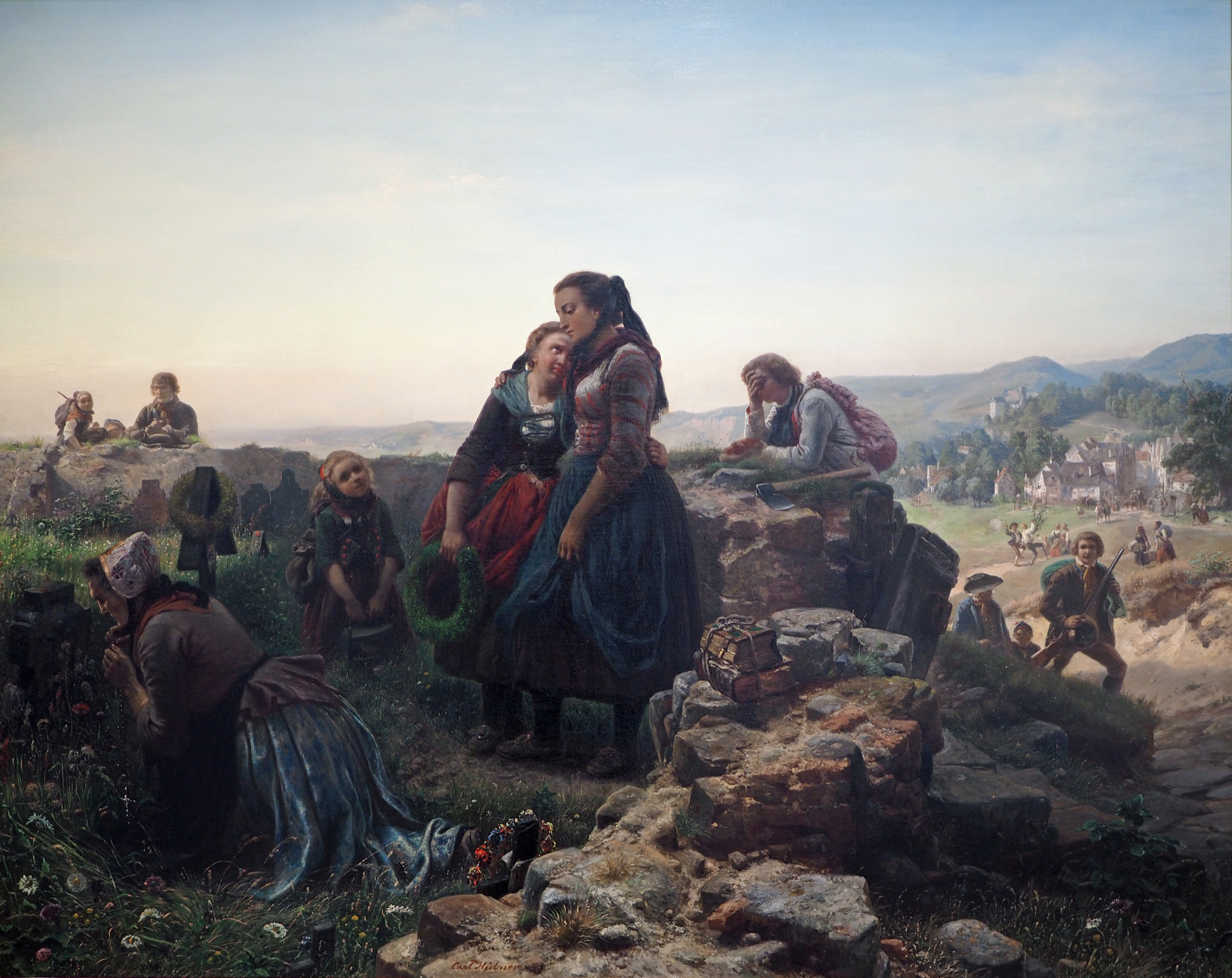
A Farewell to the Emigrants

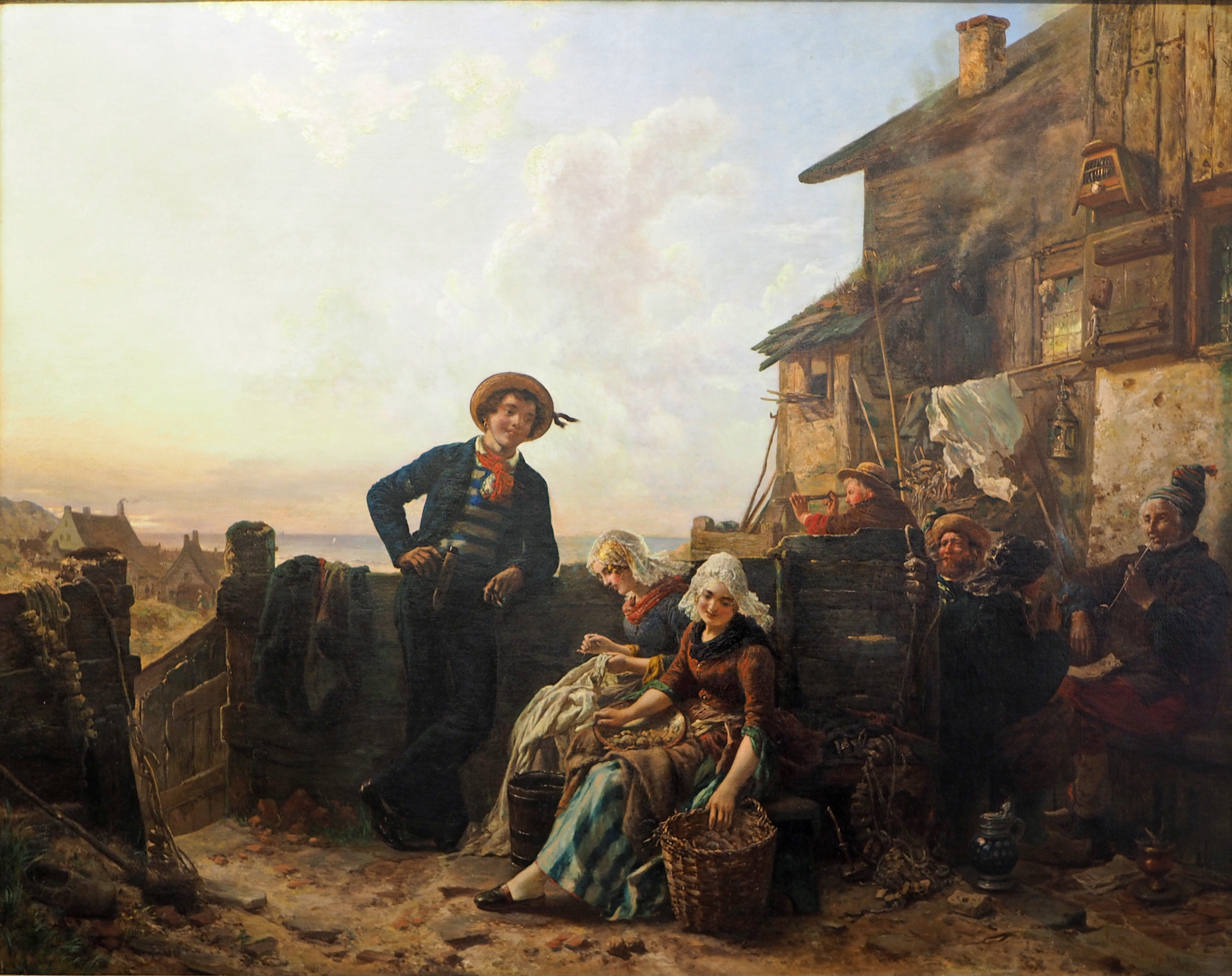
The Young Sailor as a Suitor

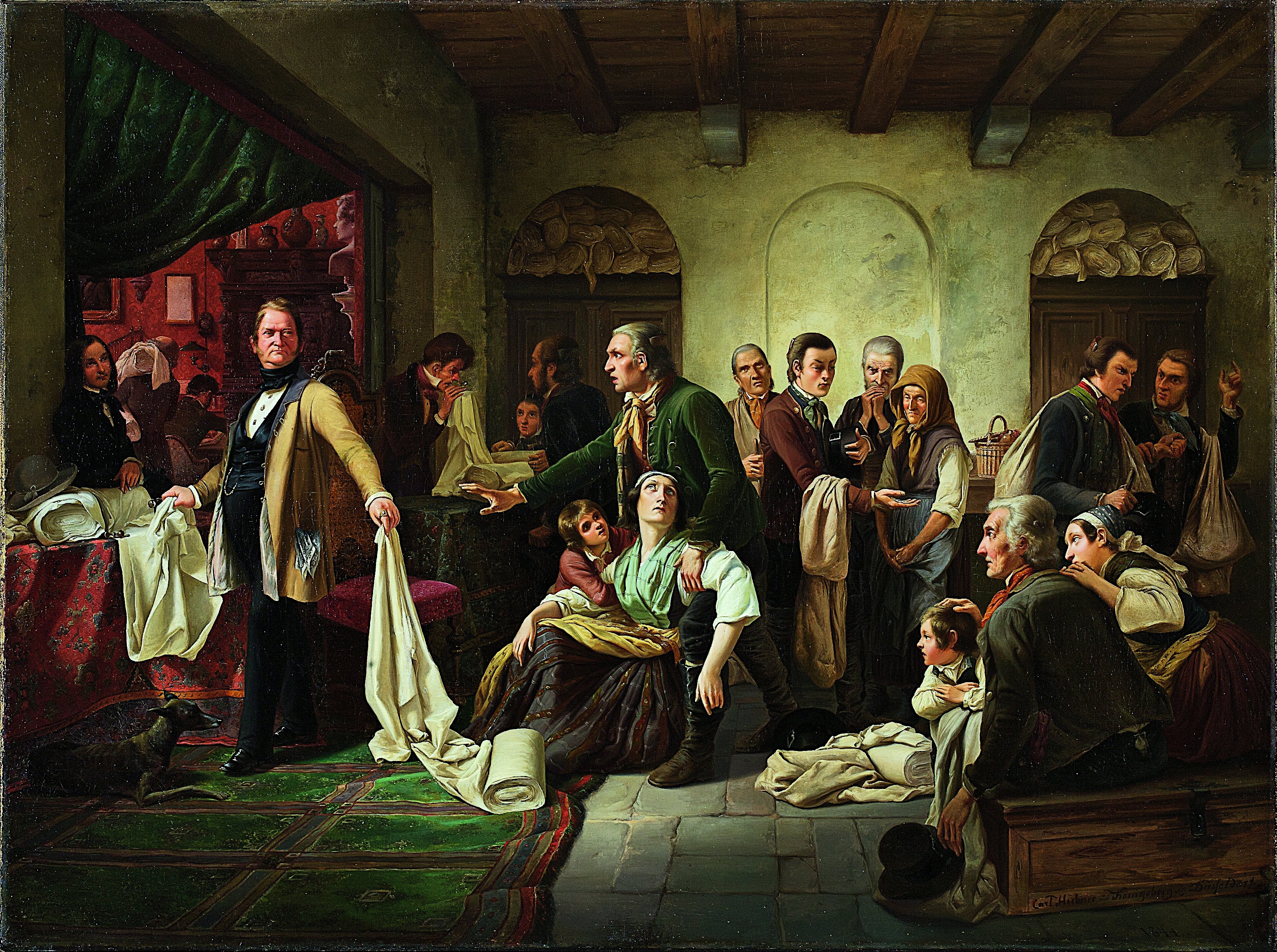
The Silesian Weavers

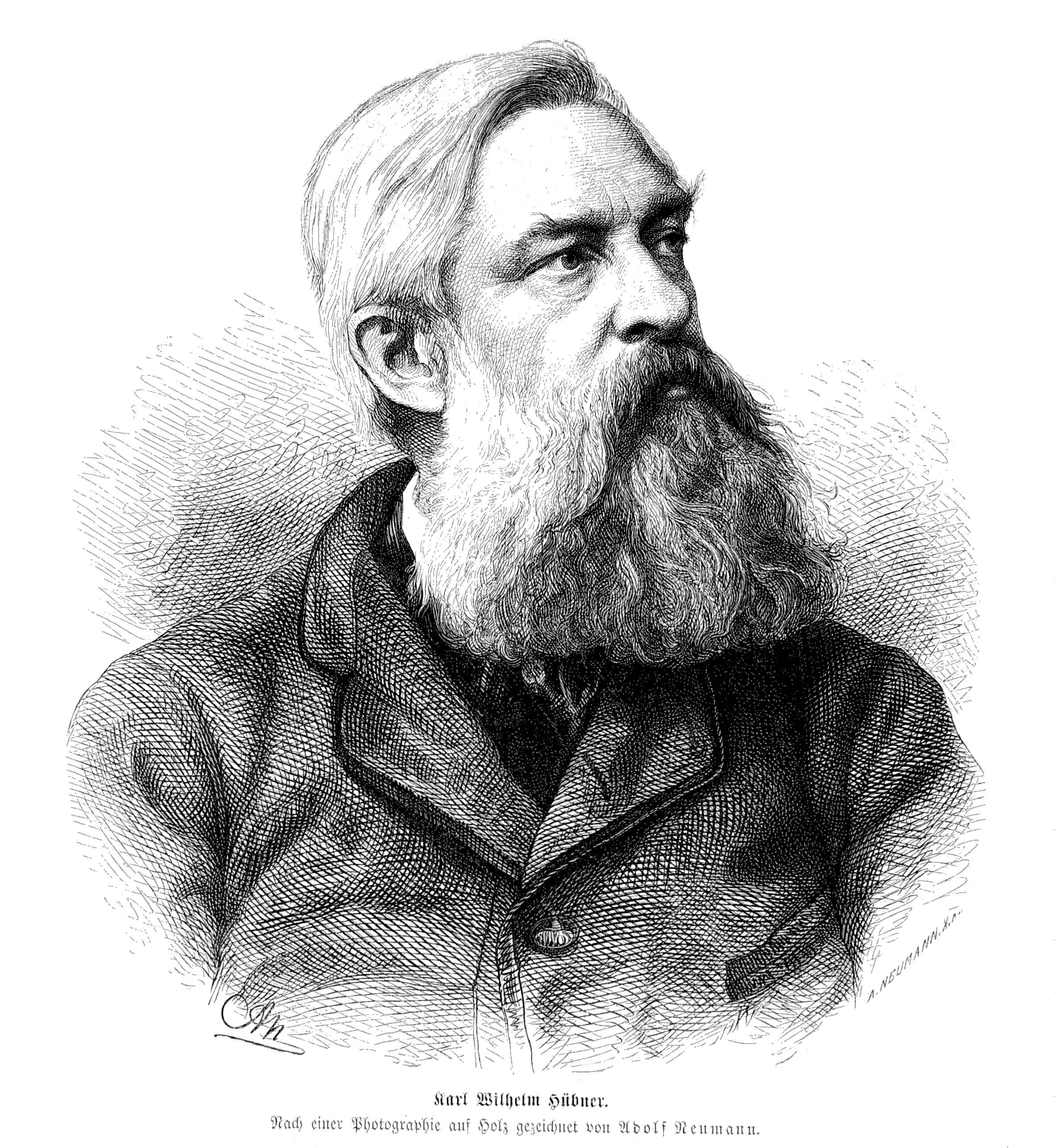
Karl Wilhelm Hübner; portrait by Adolf Neumann, from a photograph
