= Anzeiger des Westens =

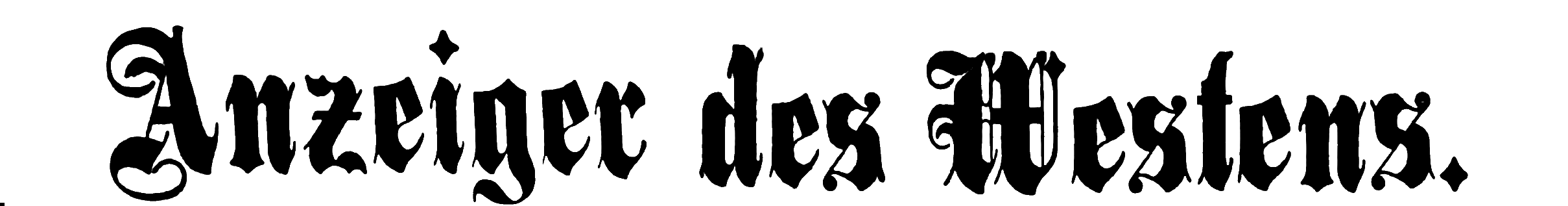

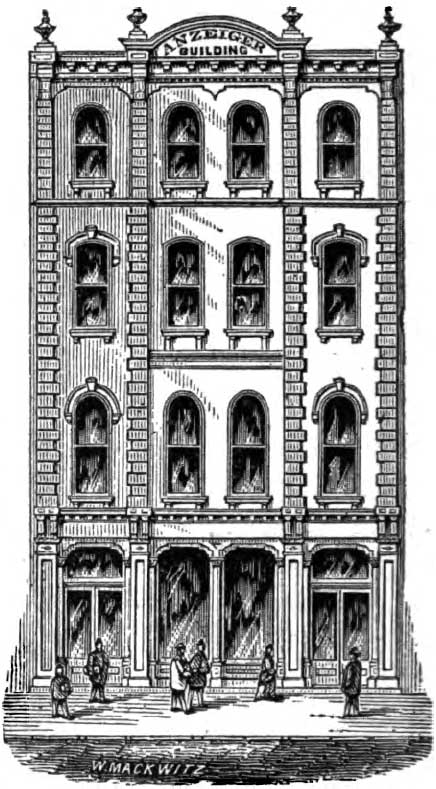
- Anzeiger des Westens building, in a woodcut from 1887
- Type: Daily German-language newspaper
- Publisher: Henry Boernstein (1850–1861)
- Editor-in-chief: Carl Daenzer (1851–1857, 1862–1898)
- Founded: June 1835
- Ceased publication: April 30, 1912
- Language: German
- Headquarters: St. Louis
- Circulation: 37,500 (1912)

The Anzeiger des Westens (literally "Gazette of the West"), which operated from 1835 to 1912, was the first German-language newspaper in St. Louis, Missouri, United States. Alongside the Westliche Post and the Illinois Staats-Zeitung, it became one of the three most prominent German-language papers in the Midwestern United States, serving the German-American population with news and features. During the 1840s, it is believed to have had the largest circulation of any newspaper in Missouri, regardless of language.

== History ==
=== Early years ===
The Anzeiger was founded by Heinrich Bimpage and B.T.O. Festen, and its first issue appeared in June 1835. At first it was issued as a weekly. For years, the paper was the leading source of German-American thought throughout the Midwest.

William Weber became editor early in 1836. He had been a German student. His republican sympathies and involvement in the Polish uprising of 1830 had made him an exile after imprisonment in Leipzig. His first employment in St. Louis had been as a librarian at the Mercantile Library.

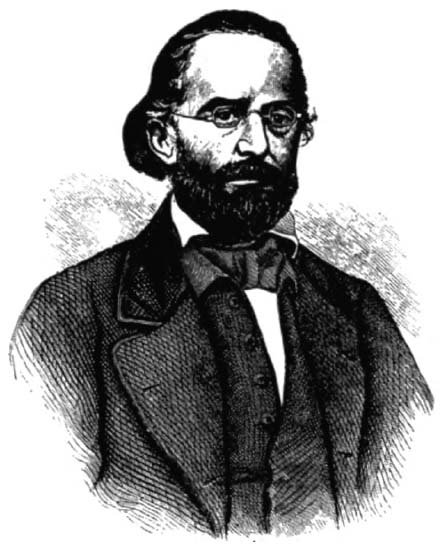
Henry Boernstein, one of several editors and proprietors, starting in 1850

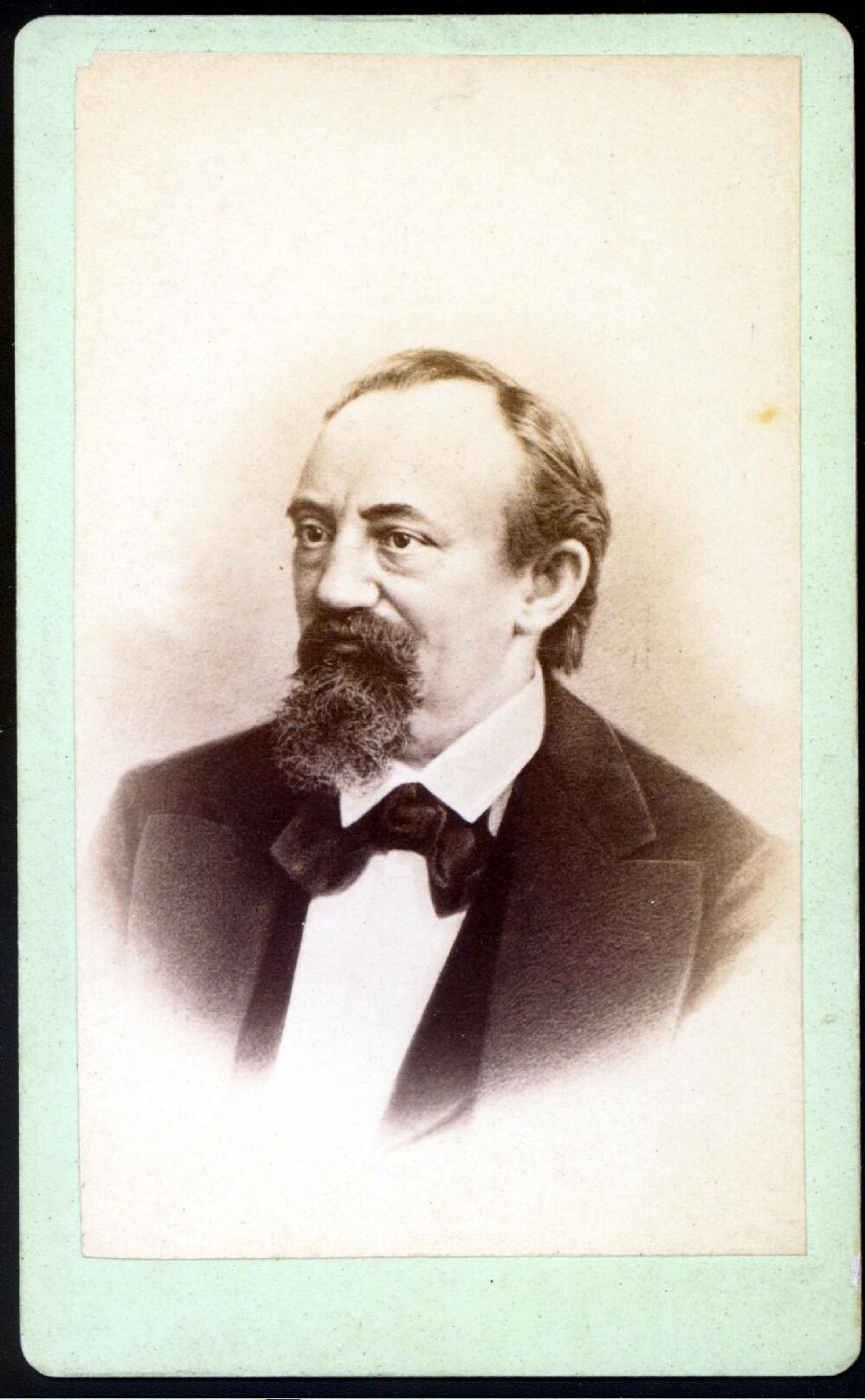
Carl Daenzer, Editor of the Anzeiger des Westens. Carte de visite by Cramer, Gross and Co., c. 1879 Missouri History Museum Photograph and Print Collection.

Weber was a vigorous young writer, and soon drew about him the leading German minds of the city and vicinity: George Engelmann, Gustave Koerner, Fred. Muench and others of such stamp contributed to its columns. Opposition to slavery was an early theme. From 1842 to 1846 the paper was issued triweekly, and in the latter year as a daily. In 1844 Arthur Olshausen secured an interest, and three years later became sole proprietor.

In 1850, Henry Boernstein succeeded Weber as editor, and very soon became proprietor and publisher. Boernstein was for years a conspicuous figure in St. Louis. In Austrian Poland he had studied medicine, served as a soldier, written editorials for newspapers, composed plays, and been a stage manager and actor. In Paris he hailed with delight the fall of Louis Philippe, but when Napoleon III came into power he fled the country, and was next heard from in Highland, Illinois.

In 1851, Carl Daenzer was employed by Boernstein as editor. Daenzer had drifted into St. Louis as a general writer. He had been a member of the Frankfurt Parliament, and had made himself obnoxious to the German government with efforts to bring about German unity by force of arms. For his rebellious course, he was condemned to ten years' imprisonment with a heavy fine. He escaped to Switzerland, and thence to the United States.

=== Native American Party ===
Educated German-Americans rallied around the paper to fight the Native American Party (or "Know Nothing" party as they became known) which was becoming strong in St. Louis. The party was anti-immigrant and anti-Catholic and thought Protestant, native-born Americans should control the government. "Know Nothingism" found stimulus in the fact that, in three months of one year in the late 1840s, 529 steamboats had landed at the St. Louis levee, bringing 30,000 immigrants to settle west of the Mississippi.

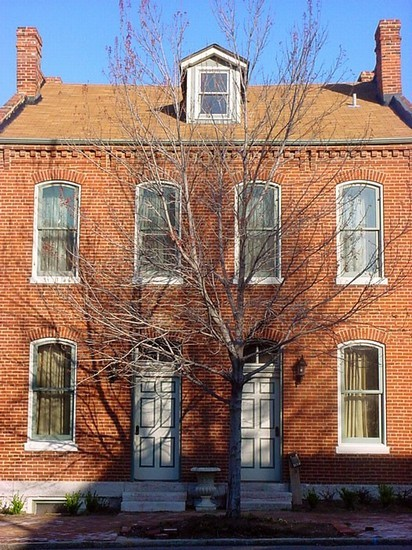
A Soulard neighborhood brick house

When the Know Nothing sentiment culminated in violence, the Anzeiger was the first object of attack. At the city election of 1852, it was charged that the German-Americans had taken control of the First Ward polls at Soulard Market, and were preventing the Whigs from voting. At that time, the Germans were classed as Benton Democrats. The report was brought up town that Mitchell had been mobbed and that Mayor Kennett, candidate for re-election, had been hissed at.

Bob O'Blennis, the gambler, and Ned Buntline, the story writer, assembled 5,000 men and marched down to Soulard Market. Pistol shots were fired. Stones were thrown. The crowd from up-town fired into the market house. A shot from Neumeyer's Tavern, on Seventh Street and Park Avenue, killed Joseph Stevens of the St. Louis Fire Company. The Americans charged the tavern, gutted it and burned it. They got two six-pounder cannons and located them on a Park Avenue corner to rake the streets to the south but did not fire. One party of 1500 people started for the office of the Anzeiger to clean it out, but met the militia and turned back.

This trouble wore itself out in a day. It was the curtain raiser for the election tragedy of August 1854. Antagonism toward foreigners had become intense. Foreign-born American citizens offering to vote were challenged and called on to show their papers and then declared to be disqualified.

=== Later years ===
Boernstein was wont to squeeze the maximum of labor for the minimum of pay out of his employees at the Anzeiger. He not only undertook to rule the then rising abolitionist movement, but he had a number of other irons in the fire. He wrote a sensational novel first serialized in the gazette called The Mysteries of St. Louis that was strongly critical of Jesuits and Catholics (a large presence in St. Louis since French colonial days), and he undertook the management of a German-language theater. As a political boss, with his arrogance and dictatorial spirit, he quickly got into disrepute among his partisans. His influence waned and subscriptions began to fall off.

Boernstein turned the entire conduct and responsibility of the Anzeiger over to Daenzer, whose name was put over the editorial columns, and who continued to edit the paper until 1857. Differences of various kinds arising between Boernstein and Daenzer, the latter withdrew, and, with the aid of friends, started the Westliche Post which was a vigorous competitor with the Anzeiger for several decades.

Charles L. Bernays became editor of the Anzeiger after Daenzer's departure. Boernstein had been connected with Bernays in literary ways in Germany and France, and Bernays had preceded him to Highland, Illinois.

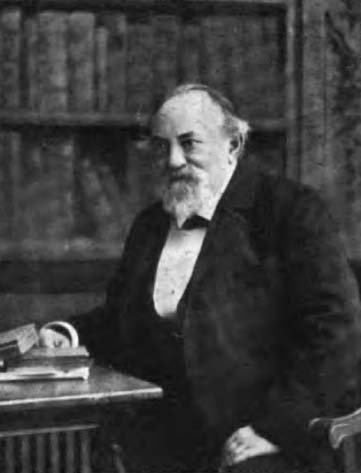
Carl Daenzer, editor, and revitalizer of the Anzeiger

When Daenzer returned to St. Louis in 1862 after having left for Europe in 1860, he found that the Anzeiger had gone out of business, likely due to Boernstein's having joined the army in the Civil War. He resuscitated the old concern under the name of the Neue Anzeiger des Westens, for the publication of which a company was incorporated, including William Palm, Charles Speck and others. After a time, the word "Neue" (new) was dropped. Although in the main supporting Democratic measures, the Anzeiger can hardly be said to have been an "organ" of that party, its chief quality being complete independence. During the agitation of the money question, it was always a strong advocate of the gold standard. After 1894, Daenzer had an able assistant in Carl Albrecht, a clear and forceful writer, particularly upon European and economic topics.

On June 1, 1898, the Westliche Post and Anzeiger des Westens were consolidated, the local Tribune having previously been absorbed by the Anzeiger. Emil Preetorius of the Westliche Post and Daenzer both retired. Under the consolidation both papers, the Morning Westliche Post and the Evening Anzeiger, were issued by the German-American Press Association, the stockholders being Emil Preetorius, Carl Daenzer, Edwin C. Kehr, Charles Nagel and Paul F. Coste, John Schroers, business manager. The Sunday issue was called The Mississippi Blaetter or "Leaves". The Post remained Republican in politics, and the Anzeiger independent. Edward L. Preetorius was prominent in the management, and the editorial corps included Carl Albrecht.

== See also ==
- Dreissiger
- Forty-Eighters
- New Yorker Staats-Zeitung - the East Coast German newspaper founded just the year before
- Missouri Rhineland, the local winemaking area and settlement movement that supported the city
