= Karl Ludwig Bernays =

German journalist (1815–1876)

- Bernays, ca. 1840

United States Consul at Elsinore
- In office 1862–1862

United States Consul at Zurich
- In office 1861–1862

Personal details
- Born: November 21 1815 Mainz, German Confederation
- Died: June 22, 1876 (aged 60) St. Louis, United States

Karl Ludwig Bernays (November 21, 1815 – June 22, 1876), baptized Ferdinand Cölestin Bernays and also known as Charles Louis Bernays, was a German journalist and associate of Karl Marx. Emigrating to the United States in the late 1840s, he worked as a journalist in Missouri and held a number of important positions in the Republican Party.

== Biography ==
Bernays was born in Mainz, Germany, one of eight children of merchant Klemenz Bernays and his wife Theres Kreuznach (Creizenach). The family was Jewish but converted to Christianity while Bernays was still a child, and he was baptized Ferdinand Cölestin Bernays. They moved to Oggersheim, where Bernays attended a Catholic elementary school. He later went to a Protestant school in Frankfurt and went on to graduate from a school in Speyer. Bernays began studying law at the Ludwig-Maximilians-Universität München (LMU) in Munich and then transferred to the University of Göttingen. Sometime during his university years, he lost an eye in a duel. He received his doctorate in 1844 from Heidelberg University.

Bernays became a journalist for the Deutsch–Französische Jahrbücher (German–French Annals), which was published in Paris by Karl Marx and Arnold Ruge. When it folded, he became the editor of its successor, Vorwärts! (Forward). In 1844, the newspaper was suppressed by the French government and Bernays was sent to prison for two months. On his release, he took refuge with fellow journalist Henry Boernstein, whose foster daughter Josephine 'Pepi' Wolf he later married.

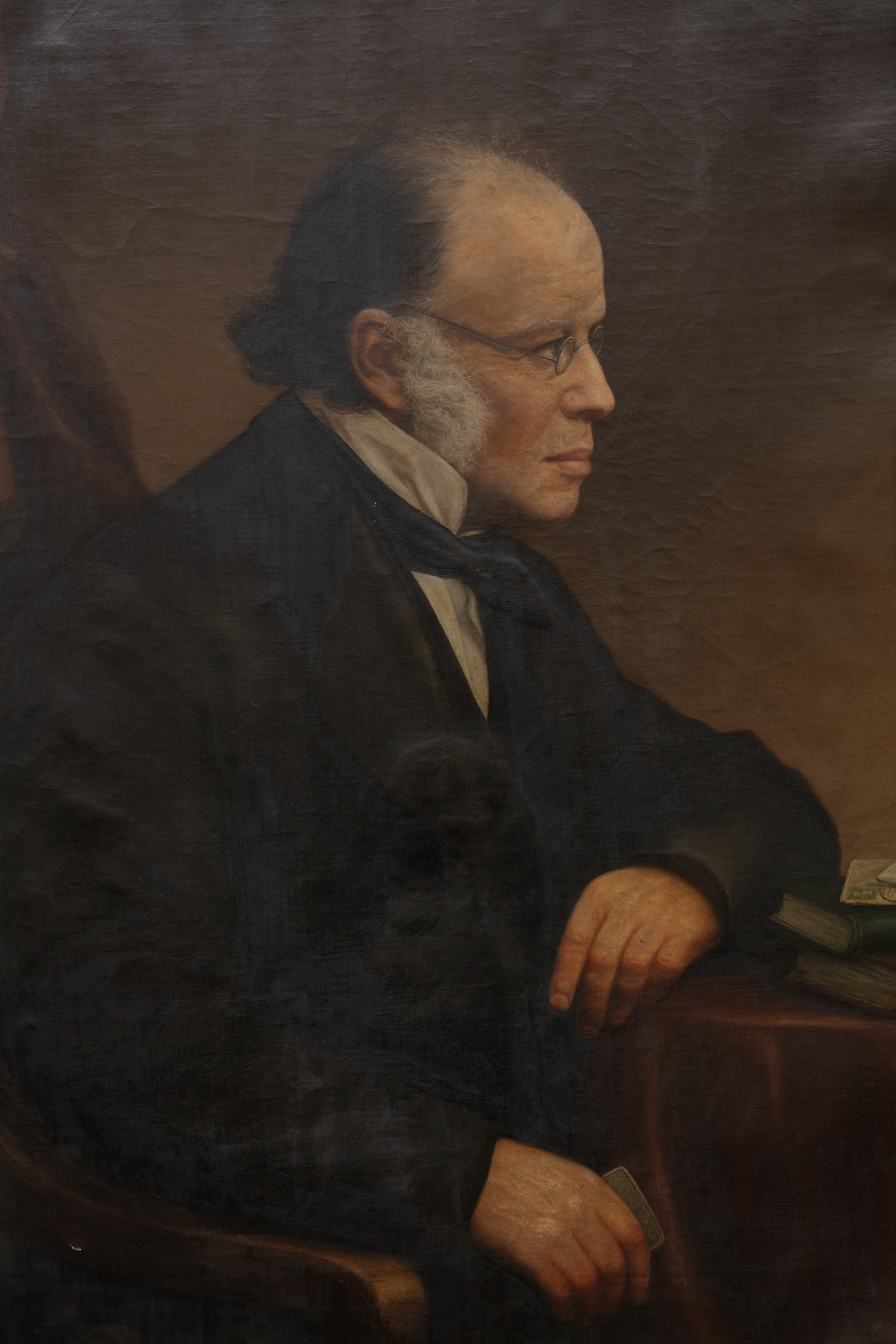
Portrait by Aline Subit, 1880

After the French Revolution of 1848 resulted in the establishment of the French Second Republic, Bernays became an official under the new regime and was sent to Vienna, Austria, as part of a legation. However, when Boernstein decided to immigrate to the United States in 1849, Bernays also decided on emigration, taking ship for St. Louis, Missouri with his family and changing his name to Charles Louis Bernays. A cholera outbreak in St. Louis decided him to settle instead in Highland, Illinois, where he got temporary work as a merchant and brewer, eventually establishing the Highland Brewery. After Boernstein arrived in St. Louis and took over the local German-language newspaper Anzeiger des Westens ("Western Reporter"), Bernays moved back to St. Louis to work as an editor for the paper. He also wrote for the English-language Missouri Republican.

During the 1860 presidential election, Bernays served as secretary of the Missouri Republican Party. He became friendly with President Abraham Lincoln, and in 1861 the president posted him to Zurich, Switzerland, and later Helsinki, Finland, as a consul. Bernays apparently did not enjoy these postings (there were protests over his Jewish background) and returned to the United States to resume work as a journalist. During the Civil War, he served as an army paymaster, with the rank of lieutenant colonel.

Around 1870, Bernays withdrew from public life and began to write his autobiography. Due to illness, he left this project unfinished. He died in St. Louis in 1876.

== Personal life ==
Bernays' wife, Josephine Wolf, was a singer and dancer. They had a daughter, Theresa, whose son, Louis C. Spiering, would be one of the chief architects of the 1904 St. Louis World's Fair.
