= Johannes Heinrich August Ebrard =

German Protestant theologian (1818–1888)

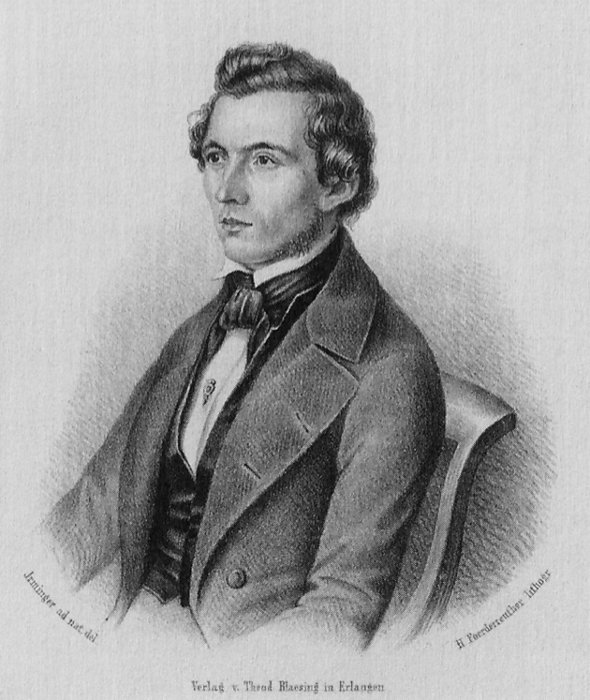
Johannes Heinrich August Ebrard

Johannes Heinrich August Ebrard (18 January 1818 – 23 July 1888) was a German Protestant theologian.

== Biography ==
Born at Erlangen, he was educated in his native town and at Berlin, and after teaching in a private family became Privatdozent at Erlangen (1841) and then professor of theology at Zürich (1844). In 1847 he was appointed professor of theology at Erlangen, a chair which he resigned in 1861; in 1875 he became pastor of the French reformed church in the same city.

As a critic, Ebrard occupied a very moderate standpoint; as a writer his chief works were Christliche Dogmatik (2 volumes, 1851), Vorlesungen über praktische Theologie (1864), and Apologetik (1874–1875, Eng. trans. 1886). His work on John's Gospel, Das Evangelium Johannis und die neueste Hypothese über seine Entstehung was published in 1845.

He also edited and completed Hermann Olshausen's commentary, himself writing the volumes on the Epistle to the Hebrews, the Johannine epistles, and Revelation. In the department of belles-lettres he wrote a good deal under such pseudonyms as Christian Deutsch, Gottfried Flammberg and Sigmund Sturm.
