= The Weavers (play) =

1892 German play by Gerhart Hauptmann

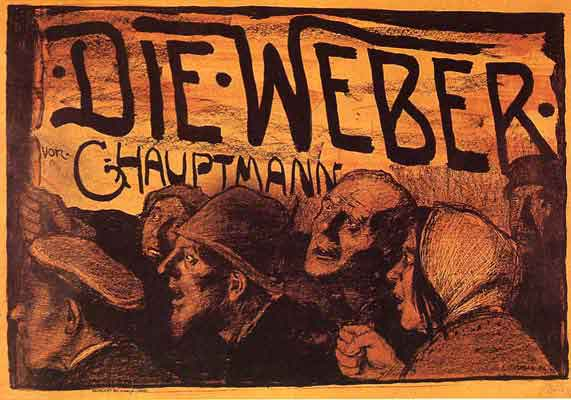
An 1897 poster for a performance of the play

The Weavers (German: Die Weber, Silesian German: De Waber) is a play in five acts written by the German playwright Gerhart Hauptmann in 1892. The play, probably Hauptmann's most important drama, sympathetically portrays a group of Silesian weavers who staged an uprising in 1844 due to their concerns about the Industrial Revolution.

The play was translated into Yiddish by Pinchas Goldhar in the 1920s, after which it became a favorite of the Yiddish stage. In 1927 it was adapted into a German silent film The Weavers directed by Frederic Zelnik and starring Paul Wegener. A Broadway version of The Weavers was staged in 1915–1916.

== Plot summary ==
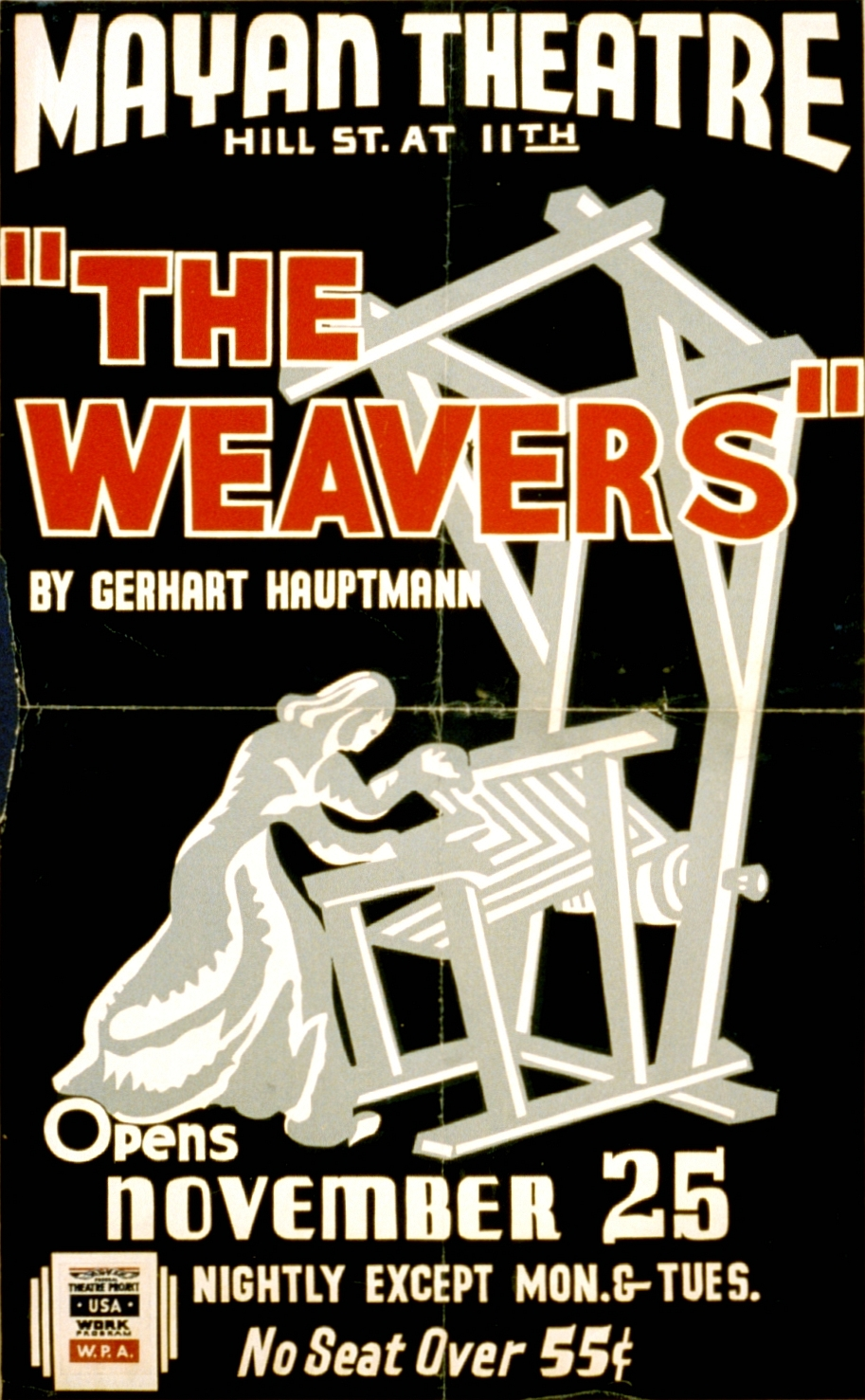
Poster for a Federal Theatre Project presentation of The Weavers in Los Angeles (1937)

Most of the characters are proletarians struggling for their rights. Unlike most plays of any period, as pointed out many times in literary criticism and introductions, the play has no true central character, providing ample opportunities for ensemble acting.

== Criticism ==
Critic Barrett H. Clark's commented in 1914: "As one of Gerhart Hauptmann's experiments in dramatic form, The Weavers is highly significant. Instead of a hero, he has created a mob; this mob is, therefore, the protagonist—or chief character—and if individuals emerge from the rank and file they are not thrust into the foreground to stay long. It is the weavers as a class that is ever before us, and the unity of the play is in them and in them alone; they are only parts of a larger picture which will take shape as the story advances, and are not intended to be taken as important individuals."

== Cultural impact ==
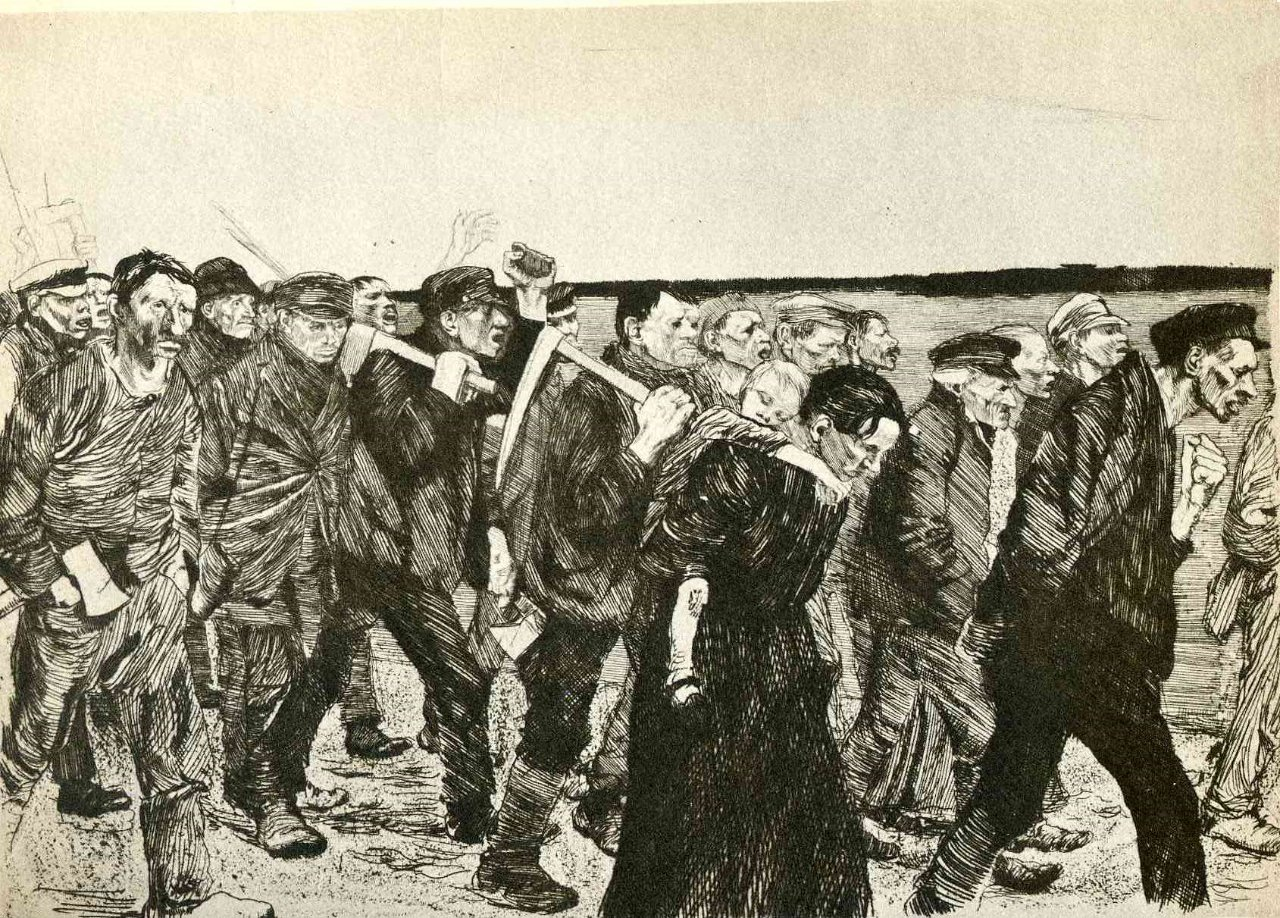
"March of the Weavers," Käthe Kollwitz

The Weavers served as the inspiration for Käthe Kollwitz's print series of the same name (1893-1897). Kollwitz claimed to have attended the premiere in Berlin. Several of these prints were included in Upton Sinclair's history of protest literature, The Cry for Justice (1915). It remains one of her most well-known cycles of work. It was republished as a portfolio in 1931.

The mid-20th century American folk music group The Weavers took their name from this play.
