= Consular Agency of the United States, Bremen =

Consular Agency Bremen
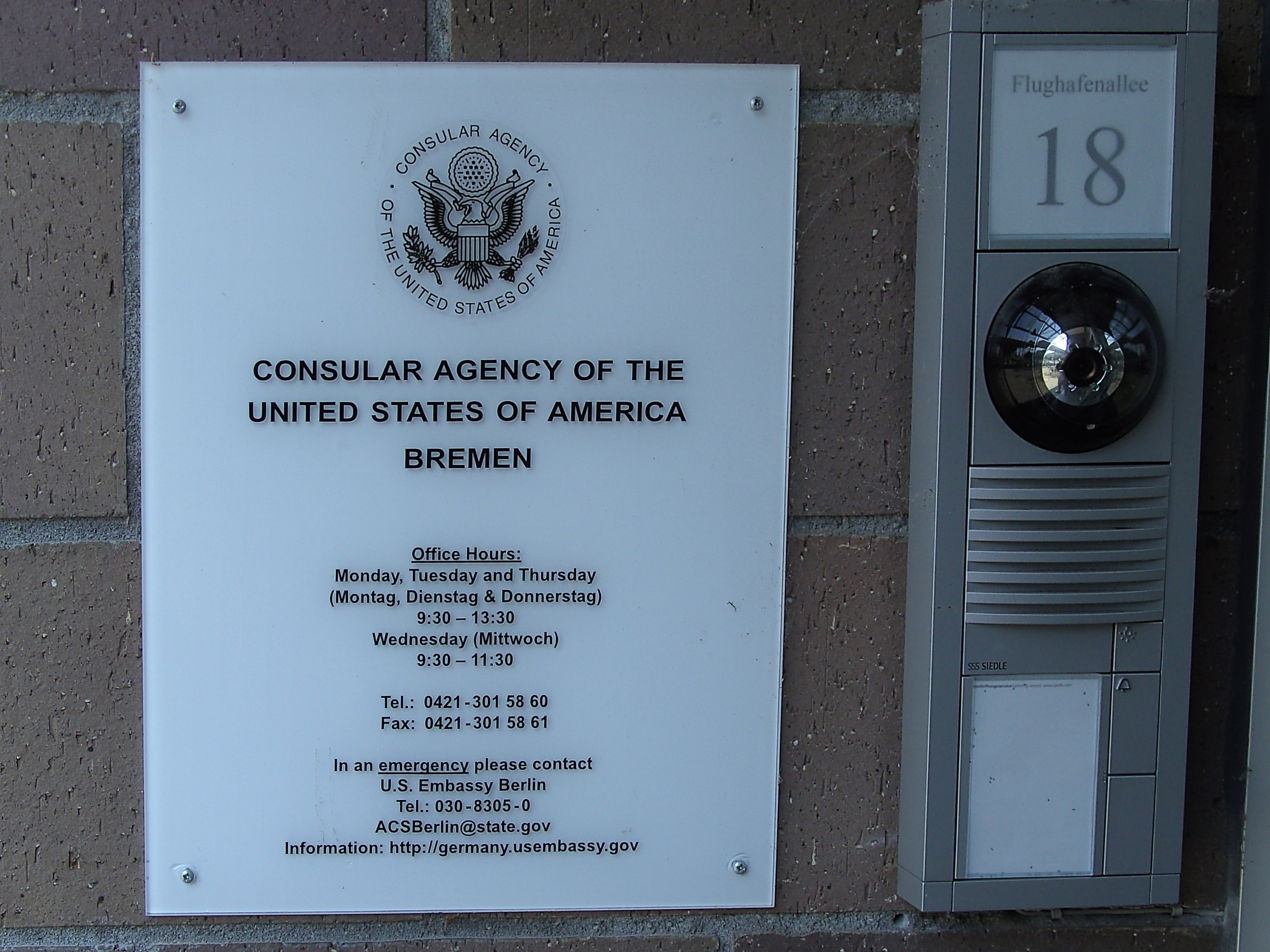
- Location: Bremen, Germany
- Address: Flughafenallee 18, 4th Floor
- Coordinates: 53.055205°N 8.783617°E
- Website: de.usembassy.gov/embassy-consulates/bremen/

The Consular Agency of the United States in Bremen, also referred to as Consular Agency Bremen, was one of the American diplomatic missions to Germany until 2018. The unit offered limited services for U.S. citizens in areas including Bremen, Hamburg, Schleswig-Holstein, and Lower Saxony. Despite that, services such as the issuing of visas or emergency passports were not provided, but can be obtained only from the U.S. Embassy in Berlin, the Consulate General in Frankfurt or Munich.

== History ==
Consular relations between Bremen and the United States can be traced back far before the agency's establishment. In 1794, a Consulate, later Consulate General, was established in Bremen under the order of U.S. President George Washington, and the original charter bore his signature. Arnold Delius was appointed consul. It was one of the earliest-opened American missions on the European continent.

Henry Boernstein was appointed consul in Bremen in 1861, the same year as the start of the American Civil War. Boernstein reported receiving a friendly reception from the Bremen government, but stated:

The rich merchant class of Bremen was, however, less favorable to our Union, and I found among them a strong inclination toward the South and its efforts at succession. This was an entirely natural result of the fact that Bremen did almost all of its business with the southern states.

In 1862, U.S. Senator Charles Sumner reported on the duties of the consul in Bremen, stating:

A large number of American vessels are constantly arriving in Bremen, requiring the immediate attention not only of the consul himself but one or two clerks, and since the establishment of a line of steamers between New York and Bremen the consular duties have been largely increased by the number of American travellers arriving and departing.

In 1862, U.S. Representative Henry Winter Davis reported that Isaac R. Diller, who had served as consul from 1857 to 1861, had incurred expenses "for fuel, lights, clerk-hire, travel, and for the relief of destitute American citizens and seamen".

=== Post-World War II ===
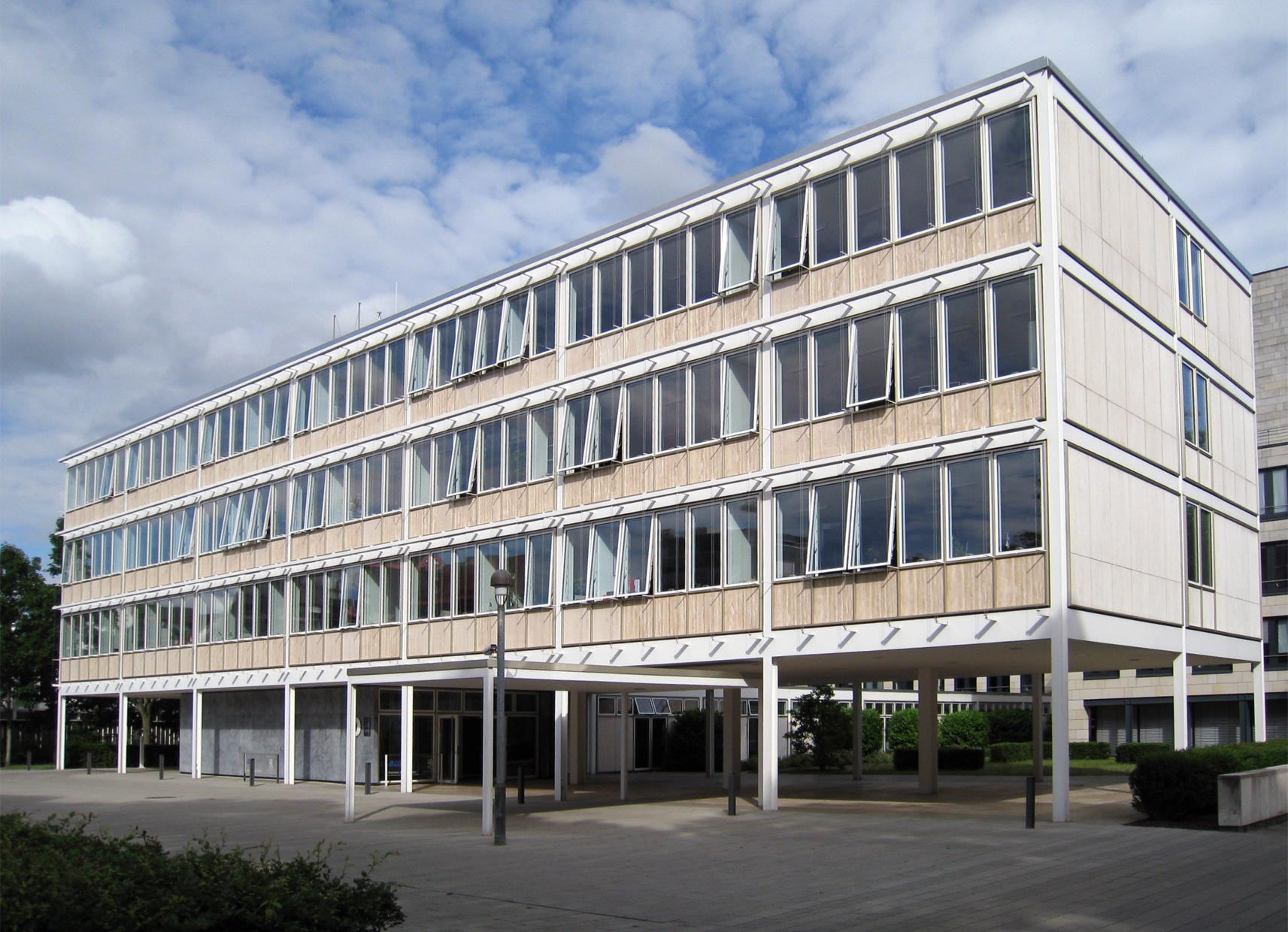
A new consulate was opened in Bremen in 1956 at the President-Kennedy-Platz. Designed by Gordon Bunshaft of Skidmore, Owings & Merrill, its architecture demonstrated the International Style of post-war Modernism, and was honored with an award from the Association of German Architects in 1974.

The six main consular offices in Germany—Berlin (consulate general), Bremen (consulate), Frankfurt (consulate), Hamburg (consulate general), Munich (consulate general), and Stuttgart (consulate)—reopened in the spring of 1946. New consulate buildings were built in the cities that had them after the war using a "common architectural language" with modernist designs. The Bremen consulate, planned by Skidmore, Owings & Merrill, was the first of these to be completed and was opened by 1955.

Martin J. Hillenbrand, who served as consul from 1946–50, described how the Joint Chiefs of Staff Directive 1067 stipulated that post-war Germany was "a defeated enemy nation" which was to be industrially disarmed and demilitarized, and that a program of restitution and reparations was to be enforced. Fraternization with German citizens and officials was also discouraged. Hillenbrand wrote:

Reality quickly caught up with abstract formulations of policy. Nonfraternization could not stand up long in the face of the human propensity for sympathy and affection. Moreover, the plight of the civil population in the midst of destroyed buildings, food and fuel shortage, and economic collapse so obviously called for help that further punishment seemed irrelevant in what had become a battle for survival...the emphasis inevitably shifted to the provision of minimal supplies to avoid mass starvation.

Hillenbrand described living well as part of the "occupation establishment", and stated that the consulate had "its own club staffed by expert German cooks and waiters who were glad to be so near good food". The consular car fleet included a Maybach limousine alleged to have been previously used by a senior Nazi official.

During the 1960s, American buildings in West Germany became locations for anti-Vietnam War rallies, and in 1967, tomatoes and eggs were thrown at the Bremen consulate. In 1986, the Consulate General was closed.

In 2000, American consular presence in Bremen become the Consular Agency, and a Consular Agent acts as the head of mission. At first the office sat on the location of Bremen World Trade Center, then in 2011 it moved into its present address at Flughafenallee 18, right inside the Bremen Airport.

The consular agency was temporarily closed in September 2017; this closure was rendered permanent on December 31, 2018.

== See also ==
- List of diplomatic missions of the United States
- List of diplomatic missions in Germany
