= Theodor Olshausen =

American journalist

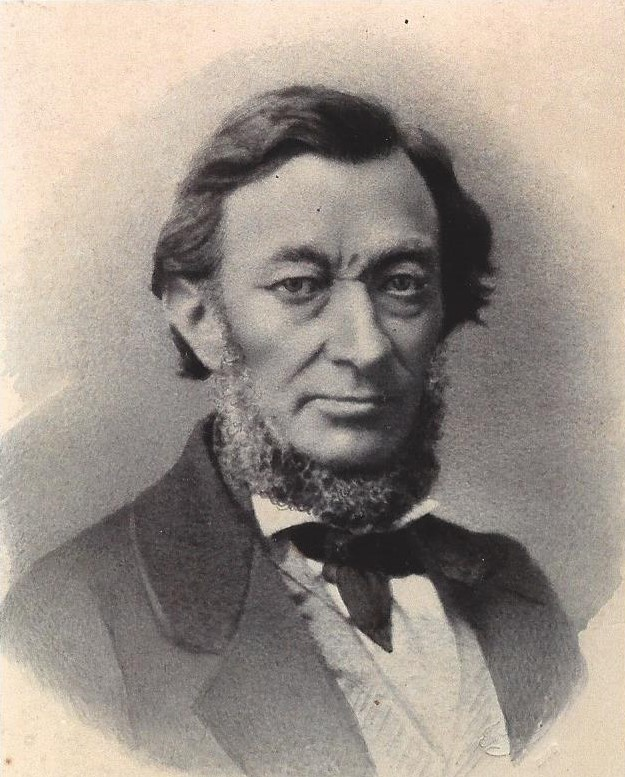
- Born: June 19, 1802; Glückstadt, Duchy of Holstein
- Died: March 31, 1869 (aged 66); Hamburg, North German Confederation
- Education: University of Kiel; University of Jena
- Occupations: Journalist, author, politician

Theodor Olshausen (1802–1869) was a German writer, journalist and politician, prominent in the Patriotic Party of Schleswig-Holstein. He lived and worked for over a decade in the United States.

== Biography ==
Olshausen was born at Glückstadt, studied law at Kiel and Jena, and, for his part in the demagogic disturbances, was forced to live in France and Switzerland until 1830. Then he settled in Kiel, and became an ardent advocate of the independence of the provinces. He was imprisoned in 1846 for his bold opposition, but his influence was all the stronger in the Revolution of 1848, and he became a member of the provisional Government, resigning to enter the Diet. In 1851 he was excluded from the amnesty, went to America, and lived in New York City and St. Louis. In the latter city, he was the editor-in-chief of the Westliche Post during the American Civil War. In 1865, he returned to Hamburg. He died there in 1869.

== Writings ==
- Entwurf einer Bittschrift an deutsche Fürsten. Zweite, mit einer Nachschrift vermehrte Auflage. Commission der Universitäts-Buchhandlung, Kiel 1830. CAU Kiel
- Das Dänische Königsgesetz. Das ist das fortwährend geltende Grundgesetz für das Königreich Dänemark. Nach der dänischen officiellen Ausgabe übersetzt und mit einer historischen Einleitung und einer Schlussbemerkung versehen. Baurmeister & Griem, Kiel 1838. ÖNB
- Die Vereinigten Staaten von Nordamerika im Jahre 1852. Eine statistische Übersicht mit besonderer Rücksicht auf deutsche Auswanderer zusammengestellt. Akademische Buchhandlung, Kiel 1853. Digitalisat
- Die Vereinigten Staaten von Amerika. Geographisch und statistisch beschrieben. Akademische Buchhandlung, Kiel.
  - Das Mississippi-Thal im Allgemeinen. Theil I, Das Mississippi-Thal und die einzelnen Staaten des Mississippi-Thals geographisch und statistisch beschrieben. 1853.Digitalisat
  - Der Staat Missouri geographisch und statistisch beschrieben. Band 2. Hälfte 1. 1854.BSB München
  - Der Staat Iowa mit einer colorirten Karte geographisch und statistisch beschreiben- Band 2. Hälfte 2. 1855. Google
- Karte des Staates Iowa nach den besten Hülfsmitteln bearbeitet. Lithographie Anstalt von H. Cordts. Akademische Buchhandlung, Kiel 1855. (Aus Der Staat Iowa mit einer colorirten Karte geographisch und statistisch beschreiben von Theodor Olshausen)
- Geschichte der Mormonen oder Jüngsten-Tages-Heiligen in Nordamerika. Vandenhoeck & Ruprecht, Göttingen 1856.BSB München
- Die deutsche Lebensfrage. Von Freunden deutscher Freiheit und Einheit in der Schweiz. Zürich 1866.

== Family ==
He was a brother of orientalist Justus Olshausen and theologian Hermann Olshausen.
