= Hermann Olshausen =

German theologian (1796–1839)

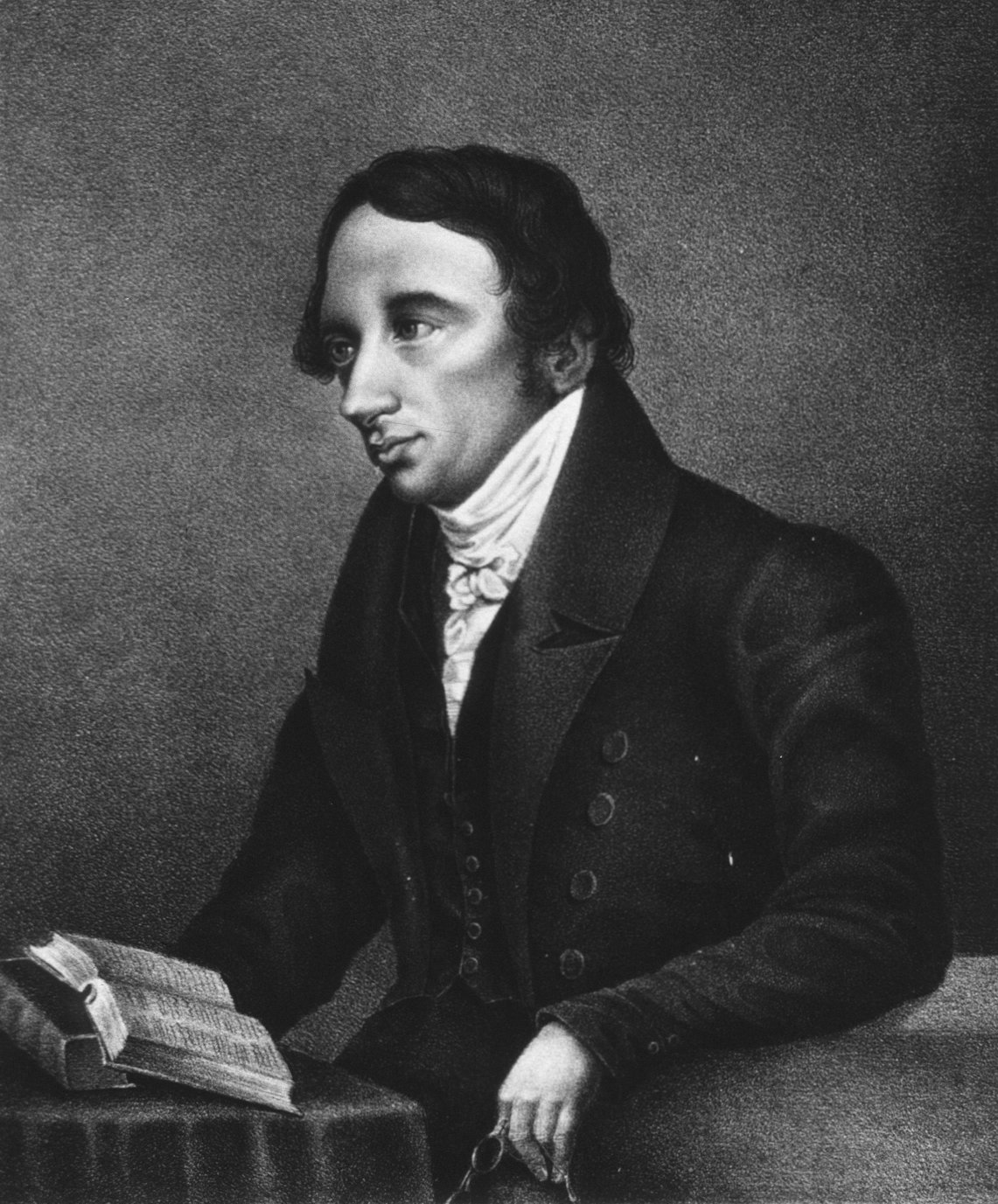
- Born: 21 August 1796; Oldeslohe, Duchy of Holstein
- Died: 4 September 1839 (aged 43); Erlangen, Kingdom of Bavaria
- Education: University of Kiel; Humboldt University of Berlin
- Occupation: theologian

Hermann Olshausen (21 August 1796 – 4 September 1839) was a German theologian.

== Biography ==
Olshausen was born at Oldeslohe in Holstein. He was educated at the universities of Kiel (1814) and Berlin (1816), where he was influenced by Schleiermacher and Neander. In 1817 he was awarded the prize at the Festival of the Reformation for an essay, Melanchthons Charakteristik aus seinen Briefen dargestellt (1818). This essay brought him to the notice of the Prussian Minister of Public Worship, and in 1820 he became Privatdozent at Berlin. In 1821, he became professor extraordinarius at the University of Königsberg, and in 1827 professor. In 1834, he became professor at the University of Erlangen.

Olshausen's expertise lay in New Testament exegesis; his Kommentar über sämmtliche Schriften des Neuen Testaments (Commentary on the complete text of the New Testament; completed and revised by Ebrard and Wiesinger) began to appear at Königsberg in 1830, and was translated into English in 4 volumes (Edinburgh, 1847–1849). He had prepared for it by his other works, Die Echtheit der vier kanonischen Evangelien, aus der Geschichte der zwei ersten Jahrhunderte erwiesen (The veracity of the four canonical Gospels demonstrated from the history of the first two centuries, 1823), Ein Wort über tieferen Schriftsinn (1824) and Die biblische Schriftauslegung (1825). In the latter two works, he presents his method of exegesis, and rejects the doctrine of verbal inspiration.

== Family ==
He was a brother of politician Theodor Olshausen and orientalist Justus Olshausen.
