= Vorwärts! =

1844 Paris newspaper

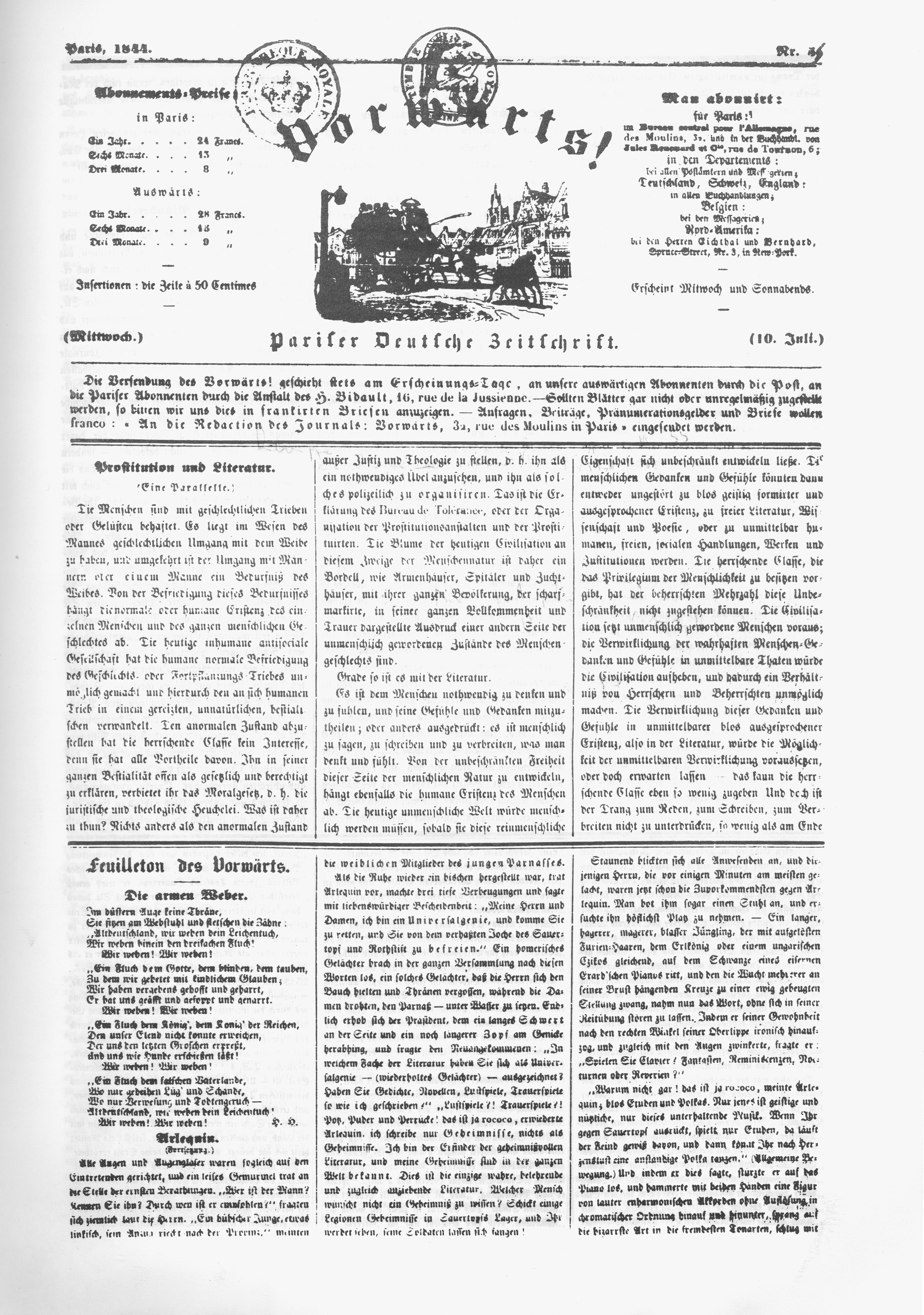
Vorwärts! front page, 10 June 1844

Vorwärts! (German pronunciation: [ˈfɔʁvɛʁts], Forward!) was a biweekly newspaper published in Paris from January to December 1844. The journal was seen as "the most radical" in contemporary Europe. The newspaper circulation was about a thousand copies. It had a subtitle Pariser Signale aus Kunst, Wissenschaft, Theater, Musik, Literatur und geselligem Leben (Paris signals from the arts, science, theater, music, literature and social life). From 3 July 1844 the title changed to Vorwärts. Pariser Deutsche Zeitschrift (Forward. Paris German journal).

The journal was sponsored by the composer Giacomo Meyerbeer and edited by Karl Ludwig Bernays. The publisher of the journal was Heinrich Börnstein (Henry Boernstein). It was the only uncensored radical paper in the German language published in contemporary Europe. The journal published many polemicists, such as Heinrich Heine, Georg Herwegh, Mikhail Bakunin and Arnold Ruge, many of them German political emigres to France,. Collaborators also included Friedrich Engels, Georg Weerth and Georg Weber. One of those who wrote for it was Karl Marx; he would have an increasingly important role in editing the journal, particularly from the summer of 1844. Marx and many others joined Vorwärts! after the closure of Deutsch-Französische Jahrbücher. Many of the activists associated with the paper were also related to the German revolutionary socialist group known as the Communist League.

One of Heine's well-known works, "The Silesian Weavers", premiered in Vorwärts!.

The newspaper was critical of the situation in Prussia and was closed in January 1845 after the Prussian king, Friedrich Wilhelm IV, protested at the "outrageous insults and libels" published in the newspaper to the French king, Louis Philippe. Marx was expelled from France as part of the resulting commotion, Bernays was imprisoned for two months, and Boernstein made a deal with the authorities.
