= The Silesian Weavers =

1844 poem by Heinrich Heine

"The Silesian Weavers" (also: Weaver-song) is a poem by Heinrich Heine written in 1844. It is exemplary of the political poetry of the Vormärz movement. It is about the misery of the Silesian weavers, who in 1844 ventured an uprising against exploitation and wage decreases, and thereby drew attention to the grievances originated in the context of industrialization. Friedrich Engels was the first to translate the poem into English.

== Origin and reactions ==
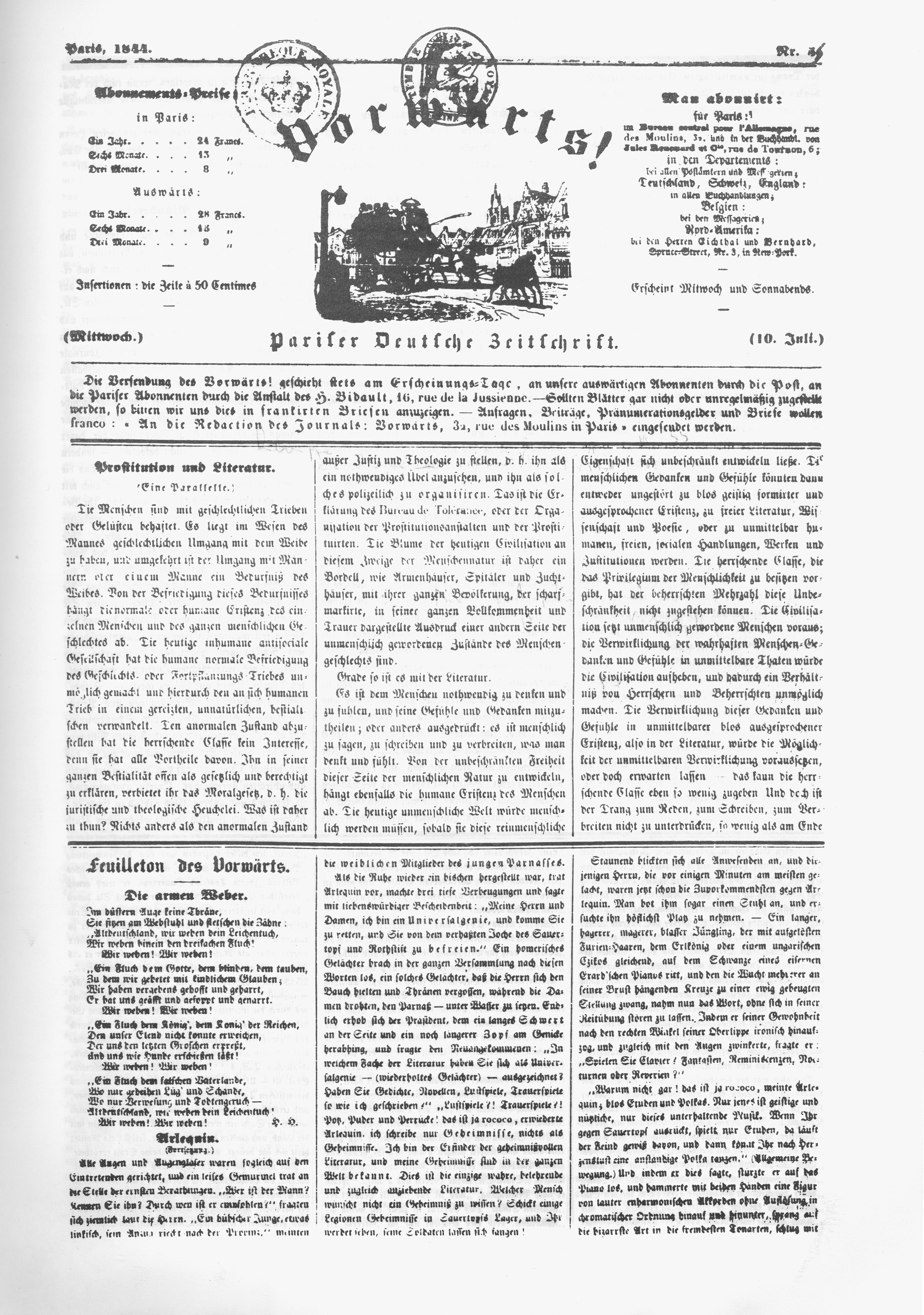
Title page of Vorwärts! (Forwards!) from July 10, 1844

The so-called weaver song was first published under the title 'Die armen Weber' (The poor weavers) on July 10, 1844 in Karl Marx's Vorwärts! (Forward!) newspaper, and distributed as a leaflet with a circulation of 50,000 copies in the rebel areas. No later than 1846 it appeared in pamphlets under the current name 'The Silesian Weavers'.

The Royal Prussian Supreme Court banned the poem because of "its rebellious tone". In Berlin in 1846 a reciter, despite the risk of publicly performing it, was sentenced to prison.

== Interpretation ==
Unlike many poems at the time, the so-called weaver-song complains not only about exploitation by the factory owners, but also tackles the authorities, criticizing general political circumstances and pushing for change.

The first verse says, "Germany, we weave your burial shroud. Into it we weave the three-fold curse." The three-fold curse is clarified in the next three verses which curse, in turn, God, King, and the Fatherland – a direct reference to the loyalty oath required of Prussian soldiers who swore allegiance to God, King, and the Fatherland.

In the three inner verses God, the King and the Fatherland are accused successively. The weavers are very disappointed that despite desperate pleas, they have received no assistance from God. The King is accused of supporting the rich and taking action against protesters by brute force, instead of addressing the suffering of the workers.

In the outer verses it is clear that the weavers are ready, self-confident in promoting their interests, and persistent in working towards a fundamental change in Germany. Each verse ends with the refrain "Wir weben, wir weben!" (We are weaving, we are weaving!) referring back to the first verse which says they're weaving Germany's burial shroud.

The poem shows that Heinrich Heine considers the concerns of the 19th century workers to be justified, and most of all holds the political system responsible for their misery. The March Revolution of 1848 confirmed his view that a profound change in Germany was imminent.

The Silesian Weavers is the best known example of the variety of contemporary literary analysis of the Weavers' Revolt of 1844, which aroused public awareness of the social question.

== Reception ==
The German metalcore band Heaven Shall Burn was inspired by this poem, in the title of their album "Deaf to our prayers". The poem 'The Silesian Weavers' was also set to music by some music artists, including folk band Liederjan on their album "Mädchen, Meister, Mönche" (Maidens, Masters, Monks), the folk band Bergfolk, folk punk band Die Schnitter (The Reapers), the gothic metal band Leichenwetter (Corpseweather), the German punk band Kapitulation B.o.N.n. on the album "Feuer!" (Fire!) And the Oi-punk band KandesBunzler and Düsseldorf DIY punk rock band Die Schwarzen Schafe (The Black Sheep). In the Liederjan setting, it is now one of the most common and most frequently sung songs in Scout and Bündische Jugend youth groups. As part of "The Revolution of the Citizens", the second stage of the socio-historical work Proletenpassion (Proletarian Passion) by the Austrian band Schmetterlinge, a slightly altered version of the poem was set to music.
