= Justus Olshausen =

German orientalist

Justus Olshausen (9 May 1800, Hohenfelde – 28 December 1882) was a German orientalist known for his contributions to Semitic and Iranian philology.

== Biography ==
Olshausen was born in Hohenfelde, and studied at Kiel, Berlin and Paris, where he was a student of Silvestre de Sacy (1758–1838). From 1830 to 1852 he was a professor at the University of Kiel, where he was appointed curator in 1848. In 1852 he was removed from his position at Kiel by the Danish government, which he had energetically opposed, and subsequently became a professor of Oriental languages at the University of Königsberg.

In 1860, he became a full member of the Prussian Academy of Sciences, and in 1874 was appointed counselor to the Ministry of Education in Berlin. He died in Berlin.

== Published works ==
Olshausen specialized in Semitic and Persian philology, and was a pioneer in Pahlavi studies. Among his written works were a critical examination of the Avesta ("Vendidad Zend Avestae pars XX adhuc superstes"), and an 1861 textbook of the Hebrew language ("Lehrbuch der hebräischen Sprache"). Other publications by Olshausen include:

- Emendationen zum Alten Testament (Emendation of the Old Testament), 1826.
- Fragments relatifs de la religion de Zoroastre, Paris; (Fragments relating to the religion of Zoroaster); with Julius von Mohl, 1829.
- Die Pehlewi-Legenden auf den Münzen der letzten Sassaniden (The Pahlavi legends on the coins of the Late Sasanian Empire), 1843.
- "Catalogue of Arabic and Persian manuscripts of the Royal Library in Copenhagen", 1851.
- Erklärung der Psalmen (Declaration of Psalms), 1853.
- Prüfung des Charakters der in den assyrischen Keilschriften enthaltenen semitischen Sprache (Examination of Assyrian cuneiform writings containing Semitic language), 1865.

== Family ==
He was the brother of theologian Hermann Olshausen and politician Theodor Olshausen, and father to gynecologist Robert Michaelis von Olshausen.
