= Henry Boernstein =

American journalist (1805–1892)

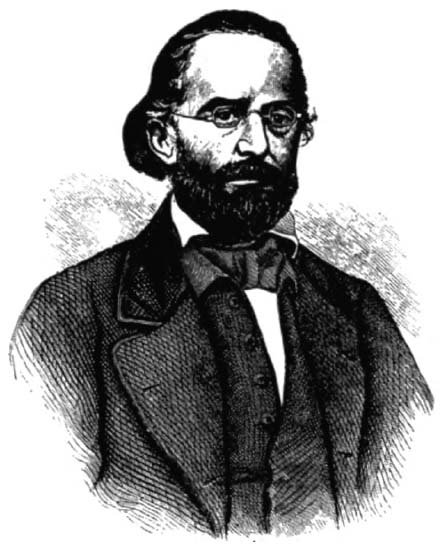
- Engraving from a photograph by Brown found in Edwards's Great West of 1860

United States Consul at Bremen
- In office 1861–1865

Personal details
- Born: November 4, 1805 Hamburg
- Died: September 10, 1892 (aged 86) Vienna

Henry Boernstein [in Europe, Heinrich Börnstein] (November 4, 1805 – September 10, 1892) was a German revolutionary who served as the publisher of the Anzeiger des Westens in St. Louis, Missouri, the oldest German newspaper west of the Mississippi River. He was also a political activist, author, soldier, actor and stage manager, and was briefly yet closely acquainted with Karl Marx during his tenure as publisher of the radical newspaper Vorwärts. He played a major role in keeping Missouri in the Union at the start of the Civil War.

== Biography ==
=== Europe ===
His family fled from his native city of Hamburg to Lemberg in Galicia in the Austrian Empire (now Lviv in Ukraine) in 1813, due to fighting between allied and French forces. He studied half-heartedly at the University of Lemberg and then read medical literature in Vienna. He acquired a special hostility to the Roman Catholic Church due to being required to attend Catholic catechism despite being a Protestant.

After leaving the university, Boernstein joined an Austrian army regiment stationed in Olomouc, Moravia, for five years, before resigning his commission as a cadet and going to Vienna. There he became involved in journalism and theater.

He married the Hungarian actress Marie Steltzer (age 15 years) on November 13, 1829. After a period in Vienna, Boernstein went on tour as an actor to cities in the Austrian Empire such as Budapest, Lubjana, Agram [Zagreb], Trieste and Venice, and he served as supervisor of the municipal theaters in St. Pölten and Linz. He became both a successful theatrical entrepreneur and a popular actor. In 1841, he and his wife toured the principal cities of Germany with great success.

His radical political views enticed him to Paris, and in 1842 he took a German opera company there, which failed to flourish. He was a friend of Franz Liszt, Alexandre Dumas and Giacomo Meyerbeer. He managed an Italian opera company in Paris before starting a "translation factory" modifying French drama for performance in German.

In 1844 and 1845 he published the radical journal Vorwärts! Pariser Signale aus Kunst, Wissenschaft, Musik und geselligem Leben ["Advance! Paris Signals from Art, Science, Music and Social Life"], later Vorwärts! Pariser Deutsche Zeitschrift ["Advance! Paris German Journal"]. It became the chief mouthpiece of Karl Marx and other Paris radicals of the time, including Friedrich Engels, Karl Ludwig Bernays, Arnold Ruge, and Heinrich Heine. French authorities shut Vorwärts! down early in 1845, expelling or imprisoning most of those associated with the journal.

Boernstein remained in Paris, recording political events in France for newspapers that could not afford a reporter there. He was assisted by his perennial co-worker Karl Ludwig Bernays. Boernstein wrote articles for Horace Greeley's New-York Tribune (translated into English by Charles Anderson Dana and Bayard Taylor) as well as for German journals in America such as the Deutsche Schnellpost of New York. At the time of the February 1848 revolution in Paris, he became president of the Société des Democrats Allemands, helping to organize a military unit under Georg Herwegh to aid the revolt in Baden. He withdrew from the revolutionary movement when socialists insisted on a right to labor. Throughout the 1848 Revolution in Paris he collected pamphlets and newspapers on the streets every day. He gave this collection to the St. Louis Mercantile Library in 1853, where it remains today. He departed France in January, 1849, after Louis Napoléon was inaugurated as President of the Second Republic.

=== United States ===
After landing in New Orleans, Boernstein passed through St. Louis, Missouri, to the Swiss community of Highland, Illinois, where he practiced as a water-cure physician until offered the editorship of the German-language newspaper Anzeiger des Westens ["Western Reporter"] in St. Louis in March, 1850. He soon became its publisher and proprietor.

To promote circulation, he published many prominent European novelists and memoirists of the time as serials, and in 1850 he wrote a sensationalist anti-Jesuit novel, Die Geheimnisse von St. Louis [The Mysteries of St. Louis], translated subsequently into English, French and Czech. It was in the tradition of the "urban mystery" novels of Eugène Sue (Les mystères de Paris, Le juif errant). It had many editions in America and Germany, and it was revived in the 1870s in the context of Bismarck's Kulturkampf with the papacy.

Boernstein introduced a sensational journalistic style in his Anzeiger, raising the ire of nativist mobs, led in one case by Ned Buntline. The Anzeiger revived the political career of former US Senator Thomas Hart Benton, winning Benton one term in the House of Representatives on behalf of "Benton Democracy." Boernstein became an early supporter of the newly founded Republican Party, and he dramatized the fact that John Frémont was not on the ballot in Missouri in 1856 by having his followers vote for the Know-Nothing presidential candidate Millard Fillmore "under protest," since the nativist position was incidentally in tune with his hostility to Catholicism.

Boernstein's freewheeling methods earned him enemies within the German community as well as among English-speakers. In 1857 Die westliche Post was founded as a competitor for support from "progressive" Germans.

At the start of the Civil War, Boernstein's enterprises included a brewery, a hotel, and several saloons. In 1859 he leased the Variétés Theater in St. Louis and launched it as an opera house. It closed when Boernstein went off to war in 1861.

In the months before Abraham Lincoln's inauguration, political tensions in St. Louis deteriorated into armed confrontation, while pro-Southern elements plotted to seize the United States Arsenal. A military force was organized in the Arsenal in April 1861, under federal auspices by Congressman Francis Preston Blair Jr., and Captain Nathaniel Lyon; Boernstein was elected colonel of the Second Missouri Volunteer Regiment (of four regiments). Before his election as colonel, his company escorted weapons and ammunition by boat from the Arsenal to Alton, Illinois. He participated in the arrest of the Missouri State Militia at Camp Jackson on May 10, 1861, and wrote a letter to Lincoln with a description of the subsequent shooting of civilians under riot conditions. When Lyon (now a Brigadier General) moved into the interior of Missouri in June, Boernstein commanded the force occupying Jefferson City, the state capital.

After the expiration of three months' federal service, Boernstein was appointed United States Consul in Bremen, Germany, by President Lincoln, although he returned briefly to St. Louis in 1862 in a vain attempt to save Blair's Congressional seat for the Republican Party.

=== Europe again ===
Boernstein served as US Consul in Bremen throughout the Civil War and was only replaced by President Andrew Johnson in 1866. Boernstein decided to remain in Europe, since the Anzeiger had been unexpectedly closed. In 1869-71 he leased the Theater in der Josefstadt in Vienna and later reviewed scripts of plays for the Stadttheater. He worked in Vienna for a while as a photographer. He retired in 1878 to Baden bei Wien to write his memoirs; they were published in the Illinois Staatszeitung of Chicago and as a two volume book in two editions, in 1881 and 1884.

A street is named after him in the Strebersdorf district of Vienna. His grave in the Protestant cemetery of Vienna, Matzleinsdorfer Friedhof, was obliterated by authorities in 1941.
