= Emil Preetorius =

American politician (1827–1905)

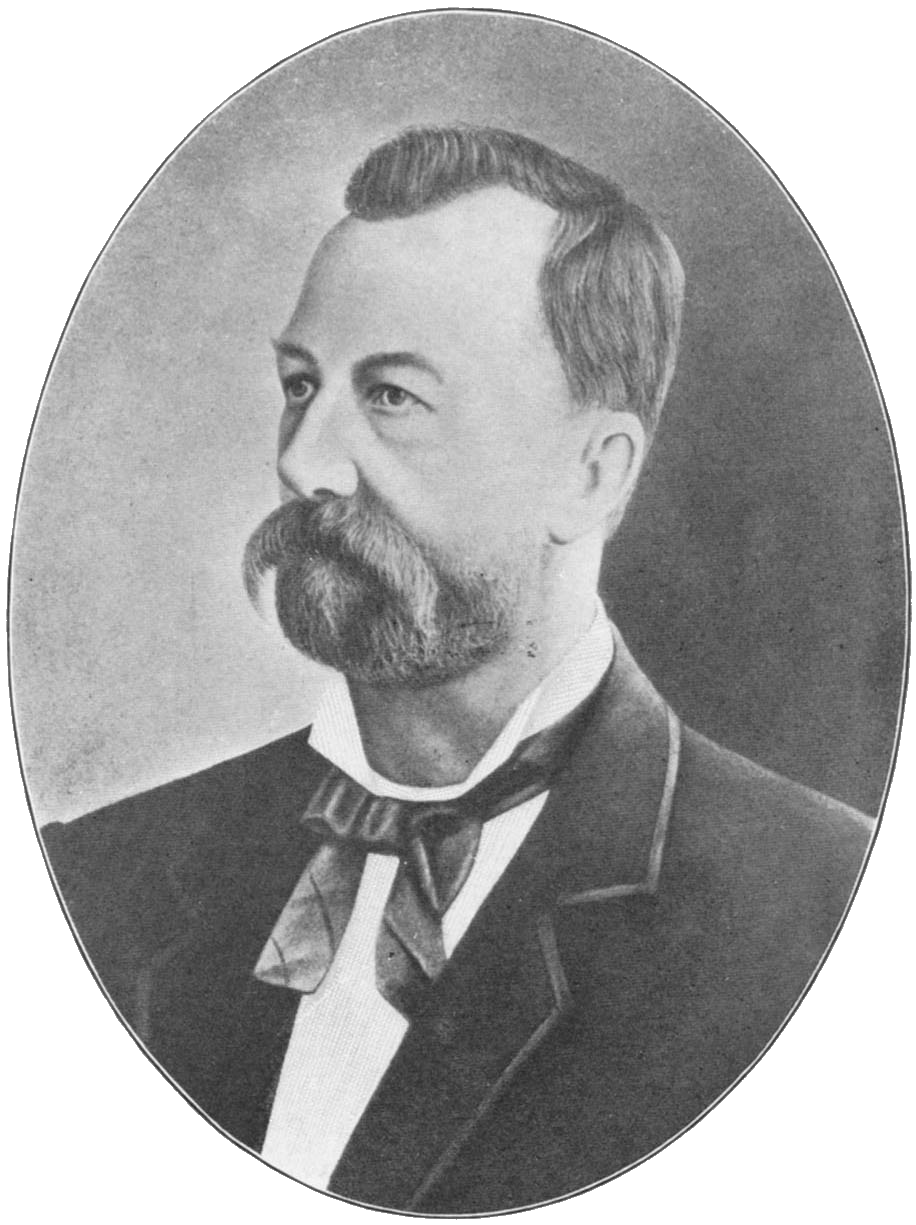

Member of the Missouri House of Representatives
- In office 1862–1864

Personal details
- Born: March 15, 1827 Alzey, German Confederation
- Died: November 19, 1905 (aged 78) St. Louis, Missouri
- Party: Radical Republican
- Spouse: Magdalena Schmidt
- Children: 2
- Education: Heidelberg University
- Occupation: Journalist, lawyer, activist

Emil Preetorius (15 March 1827 – 19 November 1905) was a German American journalist. He was part-owner and editor of the Westliche Post, one of the most notable and well-circulated German-language newspapers in the United States.

== Biography ==
He was born on 15 March 1827, in Alzey, then part of the German Confederation, and attended gymnasiums at Mainz and Darmstadt, and then the Universities of Giessen and Heidelberg. He graduated from Heidelberg in 1848. He began the practice of law with considerable success, but in consequence of having participated in the revolutionary movements of 1848, he was obligated to leave Germany in 1850.

Preetorius arrived in St. Louis in 1854, and engaged for a while in mercantile pursuits. When the Civil War broke out in 1861, he devoted his time and means to organizing German regiments and sending them to the field. In 1862, he was elected to the Missouri state legislature on the radical emancipation ticket, and positioned himself as an "immediate emancipationist". In 1864, he resumed business pursuits, became editor of the Westliche Post, and took an active part in the presidential campaign. In 1872, he identified himself with the Liberal Republicans. Preetorius was a crisp, clear writer, and a logical and convincing speaker. His lectures on aesthetics, philosophy and history attracted much attention, not only among Germans, but among English speakers as well. His direction placed the Westliche Post in the front rank of American journalism.

When the Westliche Post merged with the Anzeiger des Westens in 1898, he and Carl Daenzer, the latter the editor of the Anzeiger, both retired. Preetorius died at his home at 2013 Park Avenue in St. Louis. The year before his death, influenced by his son, Edward L. Preetorius, he had refused a decoration from Kaiser Wilhelm II of Germany. He had also refused decorations from the Kaiser in years past. He never went back to Germany saying that when he would have gone back he could not, and when he could have gone back, he would not.

== See also ==
- Forty-Eighters
- German American journalism
