= Jagsthausen =

- Municipality
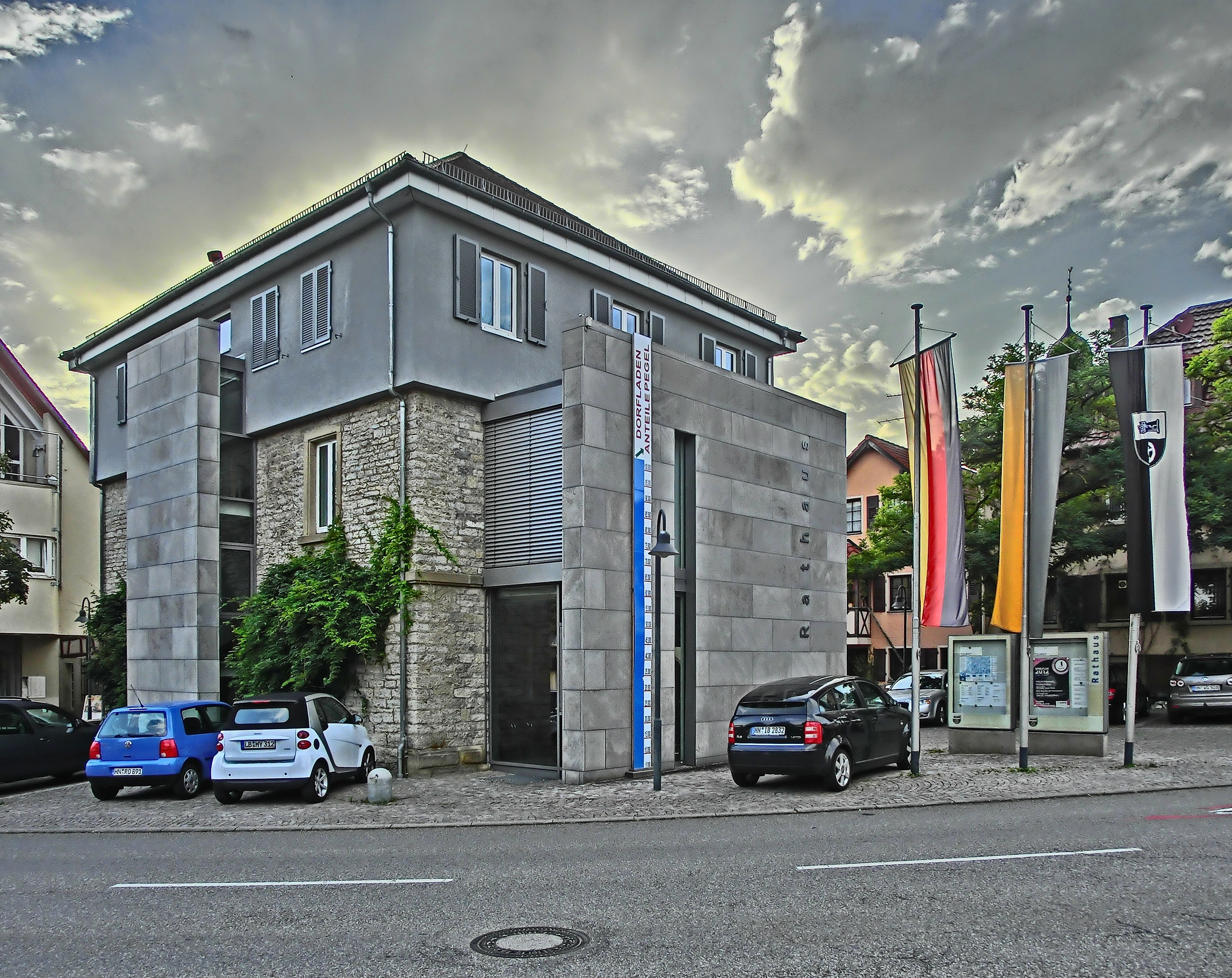
- Town hall

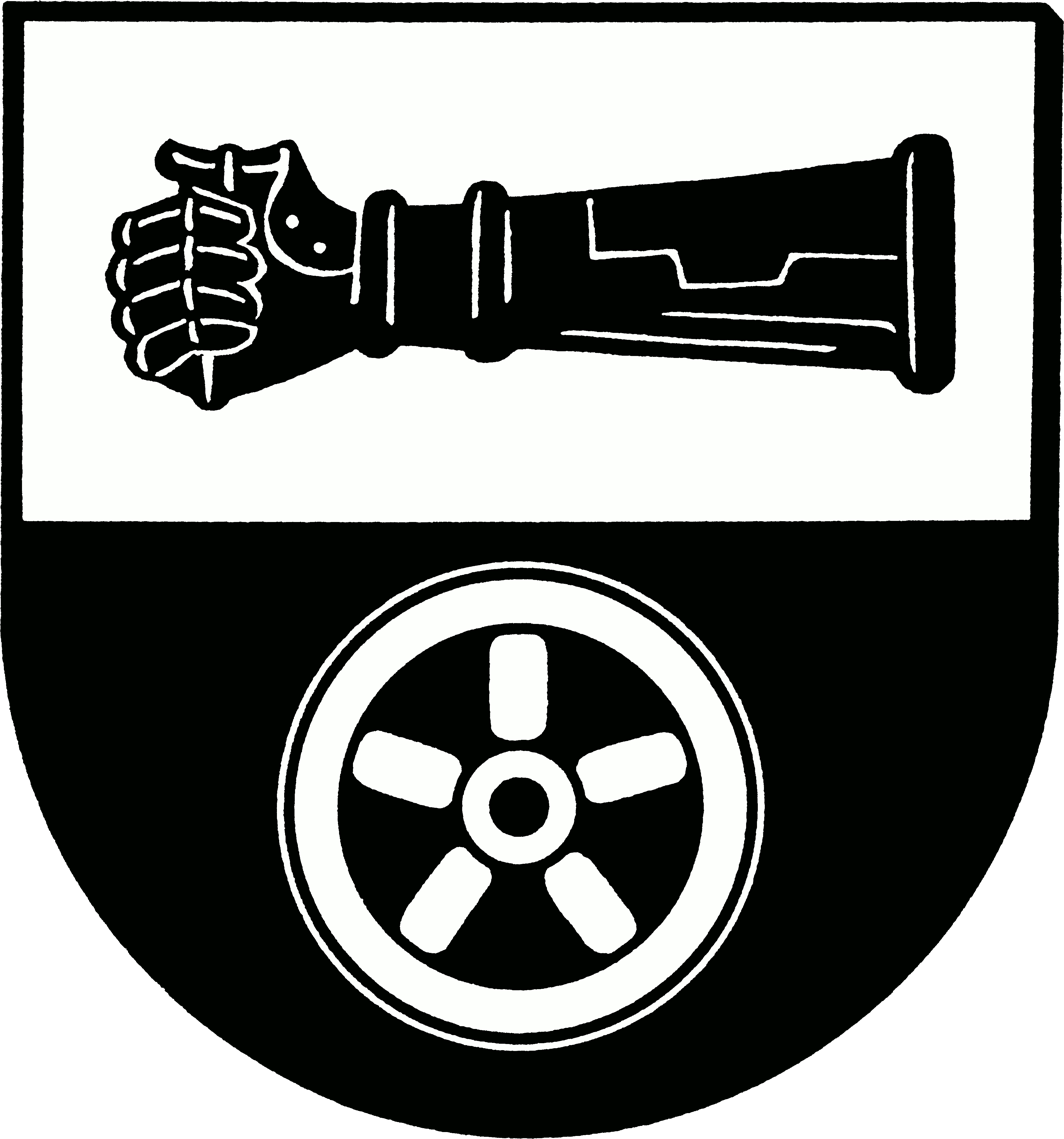
- Coat of arms

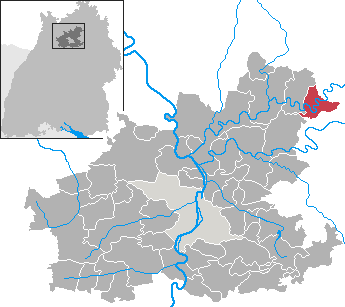
- Location of Jagsthausen within Heilbronn district
- Interactive map of Jagsthausen
- Location within Germany Location within Baden-Württemberg
- Coordinates: 49°18′N 9°28′E
- Country: Germany
- State: Baden-Württemberg
- Admin. region: Stuttgart
- District: Heilbronn
- Subdivisions: 3

Government
  - Mayor (2018–26): Roland Halter

Area
  - Total: 17.67 km^{2} (6.82 sq mi)
- Elevation: 240 m (790 ft)

Population (2025-12-31)
  - Total: 1,730
  - Density: 97.9/km^{2} (254/sq mi)
- Time zone: UTC+01:00 (CET)
  - Summer (DST): UTC+02:00 (CEST)
- Postal codes: 74249
- Dialling codes: 07943
- Vehicle registration: HN
- Website: www.jagsthausen.de

Jagsthausen (German pronunciation: [jakstˈhaʊ̯zn̩]) is a town in the district of Heilbronn in Baden-Württemberg in Germany. Roman Herzog died there.
