= Forty-eighters =

Europeans supporting revolutions of 1848

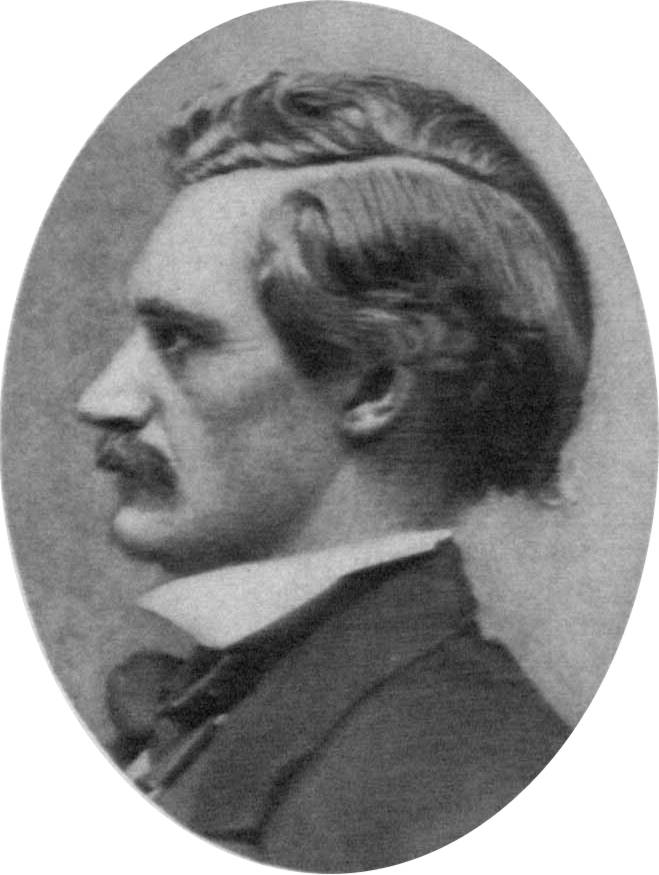
Carl Schurz in 1860. A participant of the 1848 revolution in Germany, he immigrated to the United States and became the 13th United States Secretary of the Interior.

The Forty-eighters (48ers) were Europeans who participated in or supported the Revolutions of 1848 that swept Europe, particularly those who were expelled from or emigrated from their native land after those revolutions.

In the German Confederation, the Forty-eighters favoured unification of Germany, a more democratic government, and guarantees of human rights. Although many Americans were sympathetic to their cause and saddened by their defeat, many Forty-Eighters were Freethinkers who were more influenced by post-1789 republicanism in France and the anti-religious ideas of The Enlightenment than by the U.S. Constitution. In particular, their traditional hostility towards tolerating religious practice or Classical Christian education often put them at odds with American republicanism's belief in freedom of religion and the independence of religious institutions from control by the State. Disappointed at their failure to permanently change the system of government in the German states or the Austrian Empire, and sometimes ordered by local governments to emigrate because of their involvement in the revolution, they gave up their old lives to live abroad. They emigrated to Australia, Brazil, Canada, the United Kingdom, and the United States. They included Germans, Czechs, Hungarians, and Italians, among many others. Many were respected, politically active, wealthy, and well-educated, and found success in their new countries.

== In the Americas ==
=== Brazil ===
Disappointed by the failure of the Revolution in 1848, many realised there might be adverse effects on their lives and careers. As a result, some emigrated to South Brazil, from 1852 onwards, including Fritz Müller, Ottokar Dörffel, and Theodor Schiefler. Müller emigrated with his brother August and their wives, to join Hermann Blumenau's new colony in the State of Santa Catarina. There, he studied the natural history of the Atlantic forest in that region, and wrote the book Facts and Arguments for Darwin.

=== Chile ===
After being advised by Bernhard Eunom Philippi among others, Karl Anwandter emigrated to Chile following the failed revolution. In 1850 he settled in Valdivia. He was joined there by numerous other German immigrants of the period.

=== United States ===
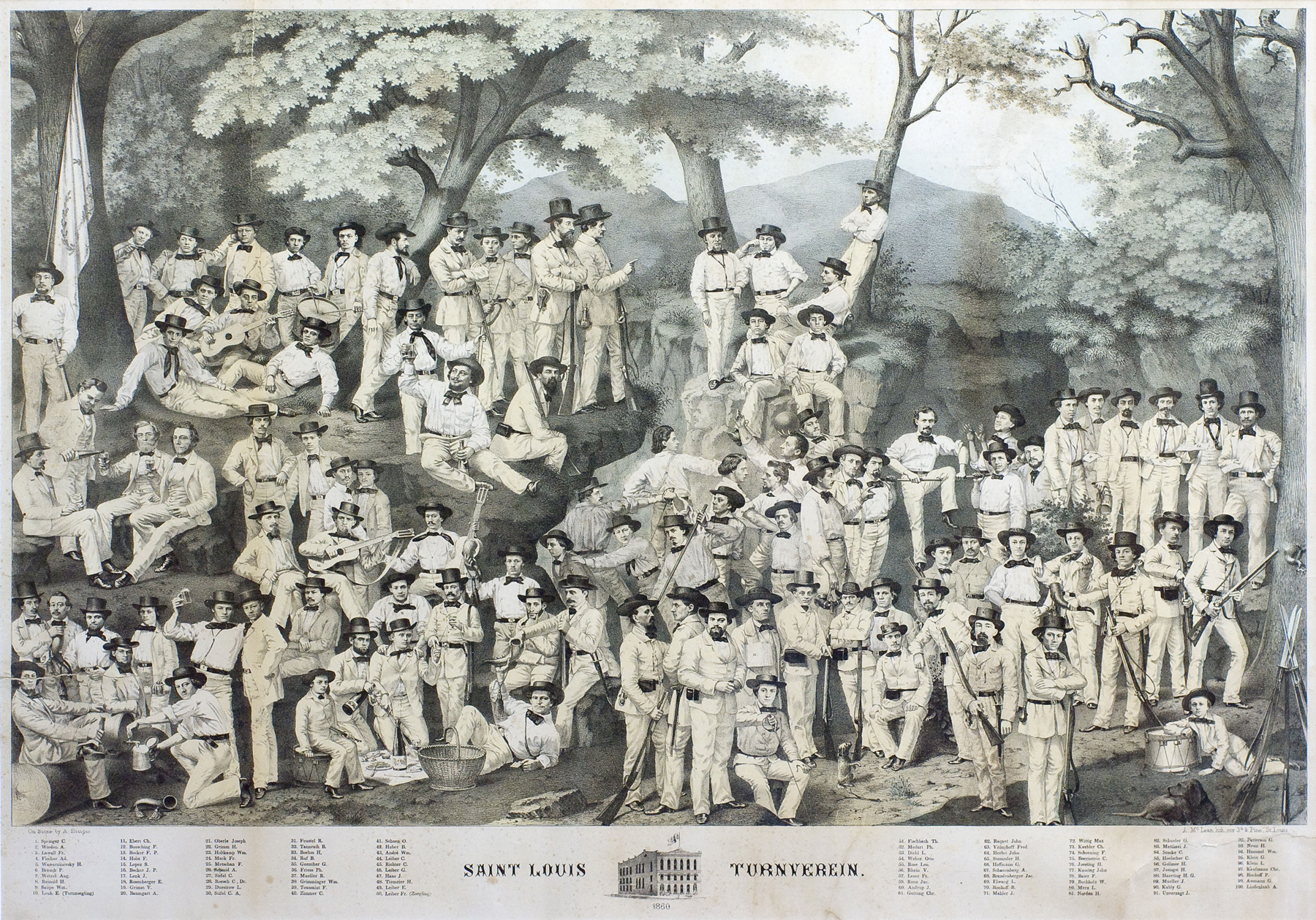
St. Louis Turnverein, 1860

Germans migrated to developing midwestern and southern cities, developing the beer and wine industries in several locations, and advancing journalism; others developed thriving agricultural communities.

Galveston, Texas, was a port of entry to many Forty-eighters. Some settled there and in Houston, but many went to the Texas Hill Country in the vicinity of Fredericksburg. Due to their liberal ideals, they strongly opposed Texas's secession in 1861. In the Bellville area of Austin County, another destination for Forty-eighters, the German precincts voted decisively against secession.

More than 30,000 Forty-eighters settled in what became called the Over-the-Rhine neighborhood of Cincinnati, Ohio. There they helped define the neighborhood's distinctive German culture and in some cases also brought a rebellious nature with them from Germany. Cincinnati was the southern terminus of the Miami and Erie Canal, and large numbers of emigrants from modern Germany, beginning with the Forty-eighters, followed the canal north to settle available land in western Ohio.

In the Cincinnati riot of 1853, in which one demonstrator was killed, Forty-eighters violently protested the visit of the papal emissary Cardinal Gaetano Bedini, who had repressed revolutionaries in the Papal States in 1849. Protests took place also in 1854; Forty-eighters were held responsible for the killing of two law enforcement officers in the two events.

Many German Forty-eighters settled in Milwaukee, Wisconsin, helping solidify that city's progressive political bent and cultural Deutschtum. The Acht-und-vierzigers and their descendants contributed to the development of Milwaukee's socialist political tradition. Others settled throughout the state.

In the United States, most Forty-eighters opposed nativism and slavery, in keeping with the liberal ideals that had led them to flee Europe. In the Camp Jackson Affair in St. Louis, Missouri, a large force of German volunteers helped prevent Confederate forces from seizing the government arsenal just after the U.S. Civil War began. About 200,000 German-born soldiers enlisted in the Union Army, ultimately forming about 10% of the North's entire armed forces; 13,000 Germans served in Union Volunteer Regiments from New York alone.

After the Civil War, Forty-eighters supported improved labor laws and working conditions. They also advanced the country's cultural and intellectual development in such fields as education, the arts, medicine, journalism, and business.

Many were members of the Turner movement.

Notable German Forty-eighters in the US

- Architects, engineers, scientists: Louis Burger, Adolf Cluss, Henry Flad, Charles Pfizer
- Artists: Friedrich Girsch; Wilhelm Heine; Theodore Kaufman; Louis Prang; Henry Ulke; Adelbert John Volck
- Businessmen, investment bankers: Abraham Kuhn, Solomon Loeb founders of Kuhn, Loeb & Co.
- Soldiers in the American Civil War: Louis Blenker; Alexander Schimmelpfennig; Carl Schurz; Franz Sigel; Max Weber; August Willich; Peter Joseph Osterhaus; Frederick Salomon; Joseph Weydemeyer; Gustav Struve; Friedrich Hecker
- Journalists, writers, publishers: Mathilde Franziska Anneke; Karl Theodor Bayrhoffer; Gustav Bloede (see Marie Bloede); Henry Boernstein; Rudolf Doehn; Carl Adolph Douai; Carl Daenzer; Bernhard Domschke; Christian Essellen (editor of Atlantis); Julius Fröbel; Karl Peter Heinzen; Rudolf Lexow (founder of Belletristisches Journal); Karl Friedrich Bauer and Sigismund Löw (founders of Pittsburger Volksblatt); Niclas Müller; Reinhold Solger; Emil Praetorius; Oswald Ottendorfer; Friedrich Hassaurek; Theodor Olshausen; Hermann Raster; Wilhelm Rapp; Carl Heinrich Schnauffer; Kaspar Beetz; Carl Dilthey (publisher of Belletristisches Journal in New York); Heinrich Börnstein; Charles L. Bernays; Emil Rothe; George Schneider (who was also a banker); Albert Sigel; Franz Umbscheiden; Edward Morwitz (who was also a physician)
- Musicians: Charles Ansorge; Carl Bergmann; Otto Dresel; Herman Trost (band leader in Sherman's army who later settled in Lexington, Kentucky, where he conducted the first band at the University of Kentucky; friend of John Philip Sousa); Carl Zerrahn; Carl August Braun, music teacher in Philadelphia
- Physicians: Abraham Jacobi; Ferdinand Ludwig Herff; Herman Kiefer; Ernest Krackowizer; Hans Kudlich; Wilhelm Loewe, Gustav C. E. Weber William Wagner
- Poets: Konrad Krez; Edmund Märklin; Rudolf Puchner
- Political activists: Lorenz Brentano (later a member of the Congress); Friedrich Hecker; Carl Schurz (later US Secretary of the Interior); Friedrich Sorge; Gustav von Struve; Wilhelm Weitling; Rudolf Dulon; Edward Salomon; Louis F. Schade, Emil Dietzsch, Ernst Schmidt
- Other: Margarethe Schurz (founder of the first kindergarten in the U.S.); Joseph Spiegel (founder of the Spiegel Catalog); Hugo Wesendonck (founder of the Germania Life Insurance Company, now The Guardian Life Insurance Company of America); Pauline Wunderlich (fought at the Dresden barricades); John Michael Maisch (father of adequate pharmaceutical legislation). George Kilgen, organ builder, saw hard service as a soldier where he was a compatriot of Gen. Franz Sigel and Carl Schurz in the revolutions of 1847–48. He was banished from his native country Germany and first located in New York City. Later he relocated his business to St. Louis.

Notable Czech Forty-eighters in the US

- Prokop Hudek, one of the "Slavonic Artillerymen" of the 24th Illinois Infantry Regiment, and one of the co-founders of the Workingmen's Party of Illinois
- František Korbel, winegrower in Sonoma County, California
- Vojta Náprstek, Czech language publisher in Milwaukee
- Hans Balatka, Moravian musician in Milwaukee and Chicago

Notable Hungarian Forty-eighters in the US

- Alexander Asboth
- Michael Heilprin
- Phineas Mendel Heilprin
- Martin Koszta
- Lázár Mészáros
- Albin Francisco Schoepf
- Julius Stahel
- Edward R. Straznicky
- Charles Zagonyi

Notable Irish Forty-eighters in the US

- Thomas Francis Meagher
- John O'Mahony
- Lola Montez (she fled from Bavaria via Switzerland, France and England)

Notable French Forty-eighters in the US

- Victor Prosper Considerant (also in Belgium for a time)

Notable Polish Forty-eighters in the US

- Włodzimierz Krzyżanowski, Civil War general and engineer

== In Australia ==
In 1848, the first non-British ship carrying immigrants to arrive in Victoria was from Germany; the Goddefroy, on 13 February. Many of those on board were political refugees. Some Germans also travelled to Australia via London. In April 1849, the Beulah was the first ship to bring assisted German vinedresser families to New South Wales. The second ship, the Parland, left London on 13 March 1849, and arrived in Sydney on 5 July 1849.

The Princess Louise left Hamburg 26 March 1849, in the spring, bound for South Australia via Rio de Janeiro. The voyage took 135 days, which was considered slow, but nevertheless the Princess Louise berthed at Port Adelaide on 7 August 1849, with 161 emigres, including Johann Friedrich Mosel. Johann, born in 1827 in Berlin in the duchy of Brandenburg, had taken three weeks to travel from his home to the departure point of the 350-tonne vessel at Hamburg. This voyage had been well planned by two of the founding passengers, brothers Richard and Otto Schomburgk, who had been implicated in the revolution. Otto had been jailed in 1847 for his activities as a student revolutionary. The brothers, along with others including Frau Jeanne von Kreussler and Dr Carl Muecke, formed a migration group, the South Australian Colonisation Society, one of many similar groups forming throughout Germany at the time. Sponsored by geologist Leopold von Buch, the society chartered the Princess Louise to sail to South Australia. The passengers were mainly middle-class professionals, academics, musicians, artists, architects, engineers, artisans, and apprentices, and were among the core of liberal radicals, disillusioned with events in Germany.

Many Germans became vintners or worked in the wine industry; others founded Lutheran churches. By 1860, for example, about 70 German families lived in Germantown, Victoria. (When World War I broke out, the town was renamed Grovedale.) In Adelaide, a German Club was founded in 1854, which played a major role in society.

Notable Australian Forty-eighters

- Carl Linger, the conductor and composer who wrote the tune for Caroline Carleton's "The Song of Australia"
- Moritz Richard Schomburgk, later director of the Adelaide Botanical Gardens
- Otto Schomburgk, pastor, editor, councillor
- Carl Muecke, theologian and editor
- Hermann Büring, in the wine industry
- Friedrich Krichauff, chairman of the Agricultural Bureau
- Heinrich Ludwig Vosz, largest paint and glass supplier in Australia; founded Dulux Australia and Clarkson Glass
- Rudolph Reimer, founder of Adelaider Deutsche Zeitung and author of Süd-Australien: ein Beitrag zur deutschen Auswanderungsfrage.
- Frederick Lindrum, international billiards champion and vigneron
- Emil Todt, botanical artist and sculptor who created "The gold diggers," held at the National Gallery of Victoria.
- Alexander Schramm, artist

== In Europe ==
=== Belgium ===
- Louis Blanc
- Victor Prosper Considerant

=== France ===
Ludwig Bamberger settled in Paris and worked in a bank from 1852 until the amnesty of 1866 allowed him to return to Germany. Carl Schurz was in France for a time before moving to England. He stayed there with Adolf Strodtmann. Anton Heinrich Springer visited France.

=== Netherlands ===
Ludwig Bamberger, Heinrich Bernhard Oppenheim and Anton Heinrich Springer all spent time in exile in the Netherlands.

=== Portugal ===
August Eduard Wilhelm Hector Achilles d'Orey (b. 1820, Wusterhausen/Dosse – d. 1872, Lisbon) was a participant in the Revolutions of 1848-49. After the revolutions failed, he fled to Portugal, where he settled and established himself as a merchant. Despite his relocation, he maintained close ties to his family in Germany, frequently returning to his homeland. His life, marked by political upheaval and cross-border connections, was highlighted in a 2018 exhibition at the Wegemuseum in Wusterhausen.

=== Switzerland ===
The following were all refugees from Germany:

- Friedrich Beust settled in Switzerland to work in early-childhood education. He lived and worked there until his death in 1899.
- Albert Dulk, a dramatist, settled in Geneva after touring the Orient. He eventually returned to Germany.
- Gottfried Kinkel moved to Switzerland in 1866 after living in England. He was a professor of archaeology and the history of art at the Polytechnikum in Zürich, where he died 16 years later.
- Hermann Köchly first fled to Brussels in 1849. In 1851, he was appointed professor of classical philology at the University of Zürich. By 1864, he was back in Germany as a professor at the University of Heidelberg.
- Johannes Scherr, novelist and literary critic, fled to Switzerland and eventually became a professor at the Polytechnikum in Zurich.
- Richard Wagner, the composer, first fled to Paris and then settled in Zurich. He eventually returned to Germany.

=== United Kingdom ===
In the early years after the failure of the revolutions of 1848, a group of German Forty-eighters and others met in a salon organized by Baroness Méry von Bruiningk and her husband Ludolf August von Bruiningk in St. John's Wood, then a suburb of London. The baroness was a Russian of German descent who was sympathetic with the goals of the revolutionaries. Guests included Carl Schurz, Gottfried and Johanna Kinkel, Ferdinand Freiligrath, Alexander Herzen, Louis Blanc, Malwida von Meysenbug, Adolf Strodtmann, Johannes and Bertha Ronge, Alexander Schimmelfennig, Wilhelm Loewe-Kalbe and Heinrich Bernhard Oppenheim.

Carl Schurz wrote in his memoir about this time:

"A large number of refugees from almost all parts of the European continent had gathered in London since the year 1848, but the intercourse between the different national groups – Germans, Frenchmen, Italians, Hungarians, Poles, Russians – was confined more or less to the prominent personages. All, however, in common nourished the confident hope of a revolutionary upturning on the continent soon to come. Among the Germans there were only a few who shared this hope in a less degree. Perhaps the ablest and most important person among these was Lothar Bucher, a quiet, retiring man of great capacity and acquirements, who occupied himself with serious political studies."

Other Germans who fled to the United Kingdom for a time were Ludwig Bamberger, Arnold Ruge, Alexandre Ledru-Rollin and Franz Sigel. Along with several of the above, Sabine Freitag also lists Gustav Adolf Techow, Eduard Meyen, Graf Oskar von Reichenbach, Josef Fickler and Amand Goegg. Karl Blind became a writer in Great Britain. Bohemian Anton Heinrich Springer was in England for a time during his years of exile.

Hungarian refugee Gustav Zerffi became a British citizen and worked as a historian in London. Lajos Kossuth, a Hungarian revolutionary, toured England & Scotland and then the United States. He returned to Great Britain, where he formed a government in exile.

French refugees Louis Blanc, Pierre Leroux, and Louis-Nicolas Ménard found relief in Great Britain for a time.

Italian Giuseppe Mazzini used London as a place of refuge before and after the revolutions of 1848.

Heligoland

In addition, the British possession of Heligoland was a destination for refugees, for example Rudolf Dulon.

Jersey

- Pierre Leroux

=== The Romanian Principalities ===
- Moldavian Revolution of 1848
- Wallachian Revolution of 1848
- 1848–1849 massacres in Transylvania

== Wandering Forty-eighters ==
- Karl Hermann Berendt, a German physician, emigrated to the United States and spent his time there and in Mesoamerica investigating Mayan linguistics.
- Ferenc Pulszky, a Hungarian politician, who joined Kossuth on his tour of England and the United States, became involved in Italian revolutionary activities and was imprisoned, and then was pardoned and returned home in 1866.

== See also ==
- Dreissiger
- German American
- German Australian
- German Canadians
- Nueces massacre
- German Mexicans
- Anti-clericalism

== Bibliography ==
- Honeck, Mischa (2011). We Are the Revolutionists: German-Speaking Immigrants and American Abolitionists after 1848. University of Georgia Press. ISBN 978-0820338231.
- Lattek, Christine. Revolutionary Refugees: German Socialism in Britain, 1840–1860, Routledge, 2006.
- Wittke, Carl. Refugees of Revolution: The German Forty-Eighters in America, Philadelphia: Univ. of Penn. Press, 1952. at archive.org
- Wittke, Carl. "The German forty-eighters in America: a centennial appraisal." American Historical Review 53.4 (1948): 711–725. online
- Daniel Nagel, Von republikanischen Deutschen zu deutsch-amerikanischen Republikanern. Ein Beitrag zum Identitätswandel der deutschen Achtundvierziger in den Vereinigten Staaten 1850–1861. Röhrig: St. Ingbert, 2012.
