= Méry von Bruiningk =

Baltic German activist

Baroness Marie "Méry" von Bruiningk (23 August 1818 – 22 January 1853) was a Russian democrat of Baltic-German origin, known for her participation in the democratic intellectual debate in the Baltic during the revolution year of 1848.

She was the daughter of Baron Johann Georg von Lieven and Maria Dorothea Margareta von Anrep and married Baron Ludolph August von Bruiningk in 1839. During the 1840s, she was a leading figure in the radical intellectual democratic circle around the von Bruiningk family, and corresponded with Karl Marx and Alexander Herzen.

In the early years after the failure of the revolutions of 1848, a group of German Forty-Eighters and others met in a salon organized by the Baroness and her husband, Ludolf August von Bruiningk, in St. John's Wood, England. The baroness was sympathetic with the goals of the revolutionaries. In addition to Herzen, guests included Carl Schurz, Gottfried and Johanna Kinkel, Ferdinand Freiligrath, Alexander Herzen, Louis Blanc, Malwida von Meysenbug, Adolf Strodtmann, Johannes and Bertha Ronge, Alexander Schimmelfennig, Wilhelm Loewe-Kalbe and Heinrich Bernhard Oppenheim.

In 1851, she and her spouse were forced to leave Russia for political democratic agitation. They settled in Hamburg, where she organized social relief for the political refugees of 1848.

She died on the 22 January 1853, in Marylebone, London, aged 34 and is buried on the western side of Highgate Cemetery.
