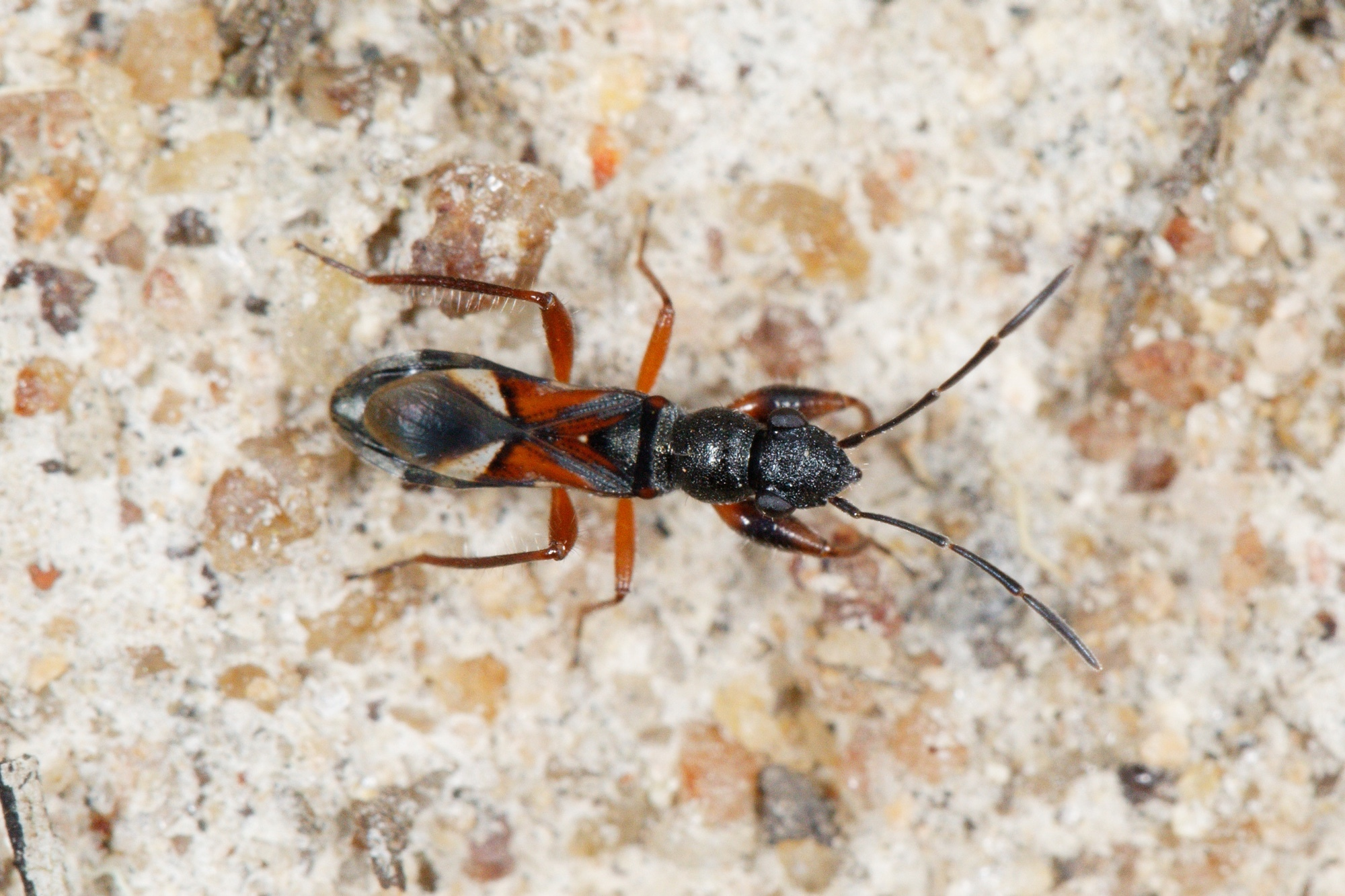
- Daerlac cephalotes, Australia

Scientific classification
- Kingdom: Animalia
- Phylum: Arthropoda
- Class: Insecta
- Order: Hemiptera
- Suborder: Heteroptera
- Family: Rhyparochromidae
- Subfamily: Rhyparochrominae
- Tribe: Udeocorini
- Genus: Daerlac
- Species: D. cephalotes

Binomial name
- Daerlac cephalotes (Dallas, 1852)

= Daerlac cephalotes =

Species of dirt-colored seed bug

Daerlac cephalotes is a species of dirt-colored seed bug in the family Rhyparochromidae, found in Australia.
