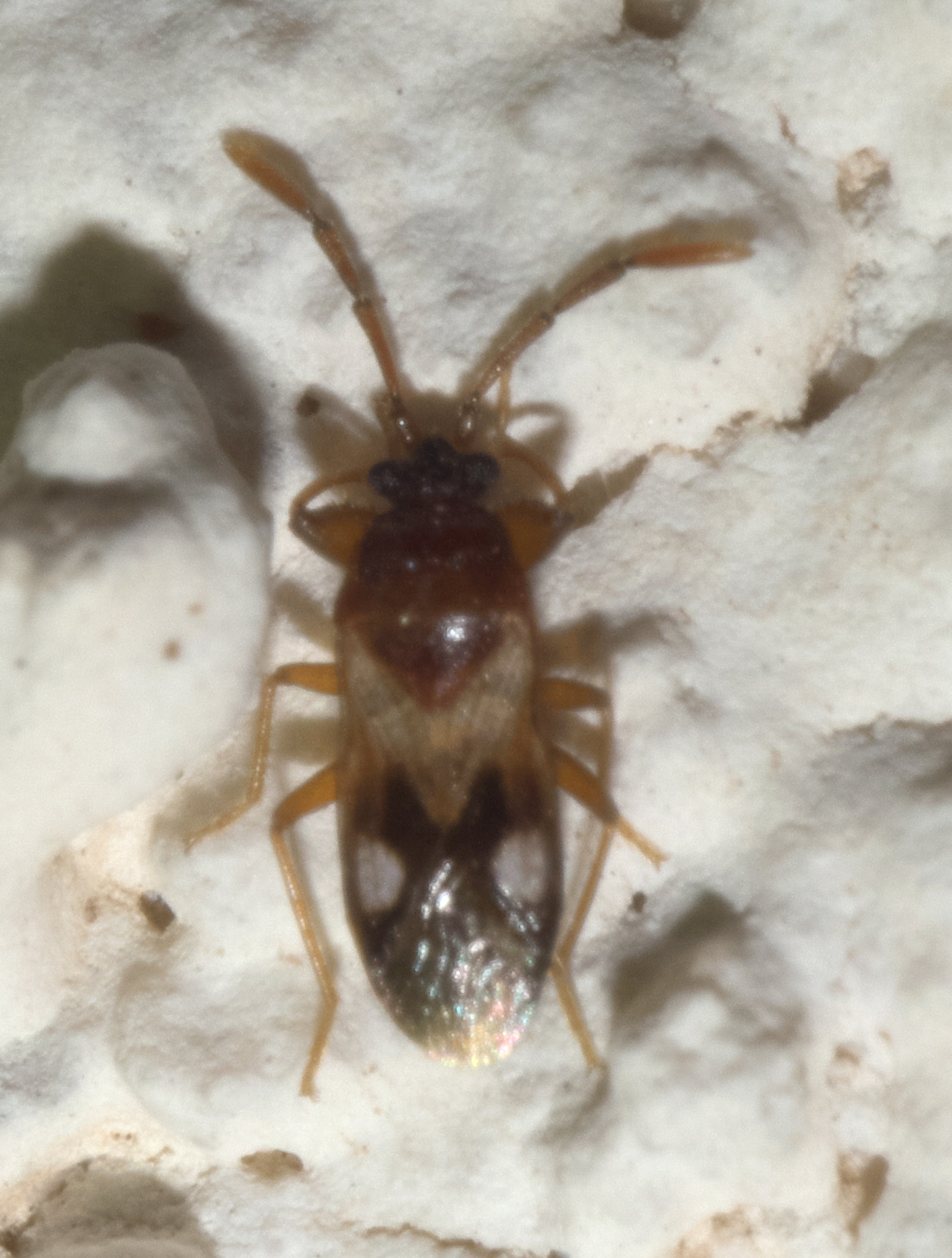

Scientific classification
- Kingdom: Animalia
- Phylum: Arthropoda
- Class: Insecta
- Order: Hemiptera
- Suborder: Heteroptera
- Family: Rhyparochromidae
- Tribe: Udeocorini
- Genus: Tempyra
- Species: T. biguttula

Binomial name
- Tempyra biguttula Stal, 1874

= Tempyra biguttula =

Species of seed bug

Tempyra biguttula is a species of dirt-colored seed bug in the family Rhyparochromidae. It is found in North America and Oceania.

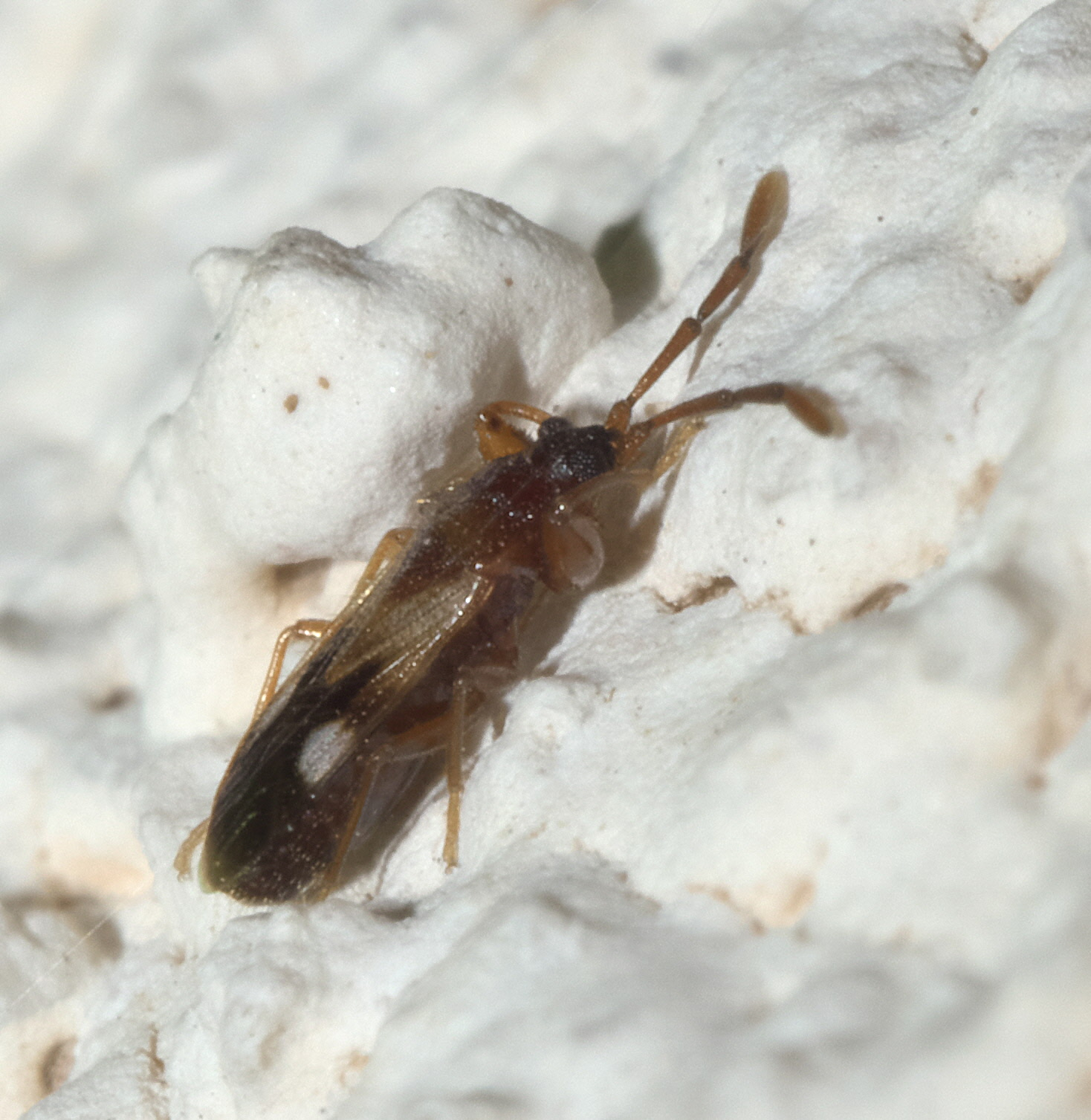
