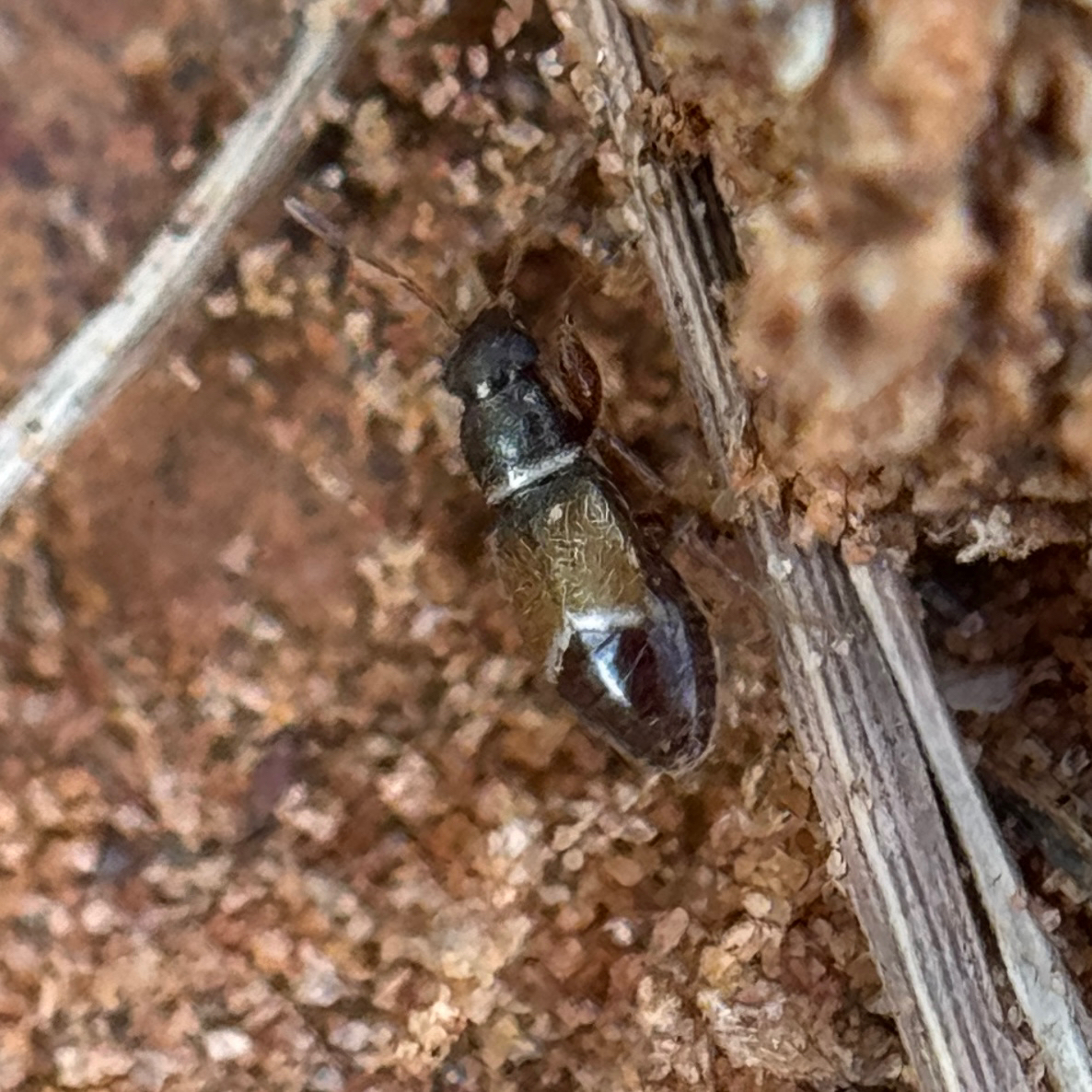

Scientific classification
- Kingdom: Animalia
- Phylum: Arthropoda
- Class: Insecta
- Order: Hemiptera
- Suborder: Heteroptera
- Family: Rhyparochromidae
- Tribe: Udeocorini
- Genus: Neosuris
- Species: N. castanea

Binomial name
- Neosuris castanea (Barber, 1911)

Synonyms
- Esuris castanea Barber, 1911

= Neosuris castanea =

Species of true bug

Neosuris castanea is a species of dirt-colored seed bug in the family Rhyparochromidae. It is found in Central America and North America.
