= Ansorge =

German surname

Ansorge is a German surname. Notable individuals with it include:

- August Ansorge (1851–1932), Bohemian politician
- Charles Ansorge (1817–1866), German-American musician
- Conrad Ansorge (1862–1913), German pianist
- Dirk Ansorge (born 1966), German Roman-Catholic theologian
- Eric Cecil Ansorge (1887–1977), British officer
- Erich Ansorge (1937–1998), Czech-German politician
- George E. Ansorge (1880–1965), American politician
- Gisèle Ansorge (1923–1991), French playwright
- Hermann Ansorge (biologist) (born 1955), German biologist
- Hermann Ansorge (chemist)
- Horst Ansorge (born 1928), German politician
- Joachim Ansorge (1939–1980), German voice actor
- Jörg Ansorge (born 1966), German entomologist
- Maria Ansorge (1880–1955), German politician
- Martin C. Ansorge (1882–1967), American politician
- Max Ansorge (1862–1940), German composer
- Nag Ansorge (1925–2013), Swiss animator
- Rainer Ansorge (1931–2025), German mathematician
- Ulf Ansorge (born 1965), German journalist
- Walther Ansorge (1886–1967), German jurist
- Werner Ansorge (1920–?), German-Israeli writer
- William John Ansorge (1850–1913), Indian-born Silesian zoologist

== See also ==
- Ansorge Hotel
