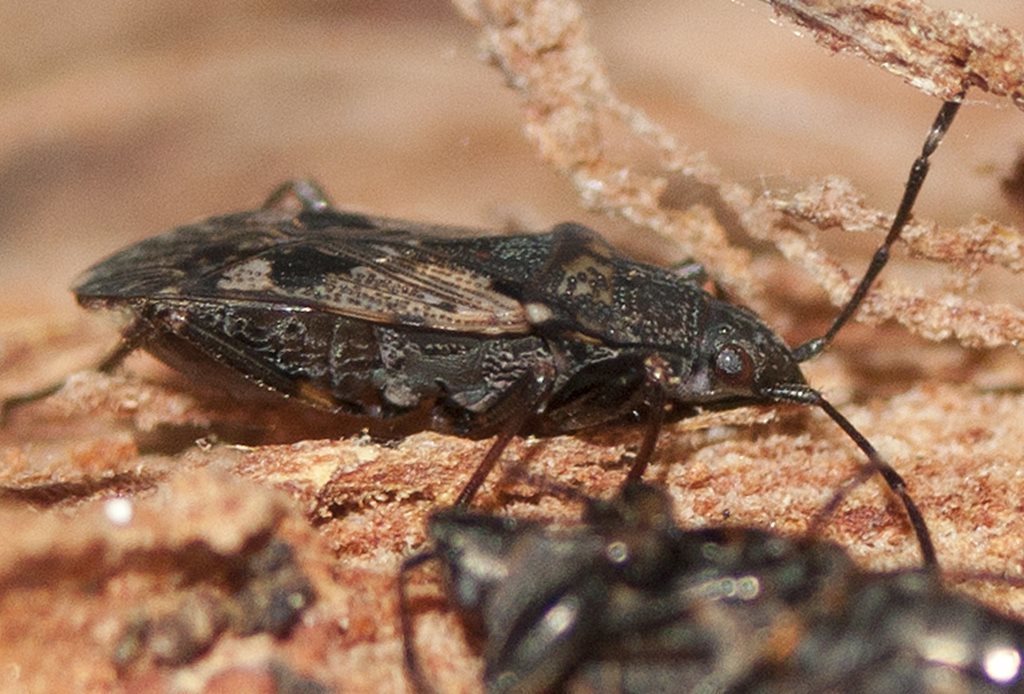
- Euander lacertosus, strawberry bug, Australia

Scientific classification
- Domain: Eukaryota
- Kingdom: Animalia
- Phylum: Arthropoda
- Class: Insecta
- Order: Hemiptera
- Suborder: Heteroptera
- Family: Rhyparochromidae
- Subfamily: Rhyparochrominae
- Tribe: Udeocorini
- Genus: Euander
- Species: E. lacertosus

Binomial name
- Euander lacertosus (Erichson, 1842)

= Euander lacertosus =

Species of true bug

Euander lacertosus, the strawberry bug, is a species of dirt-colored seed bug in the family Rhyparochromidae, found in Australia.
