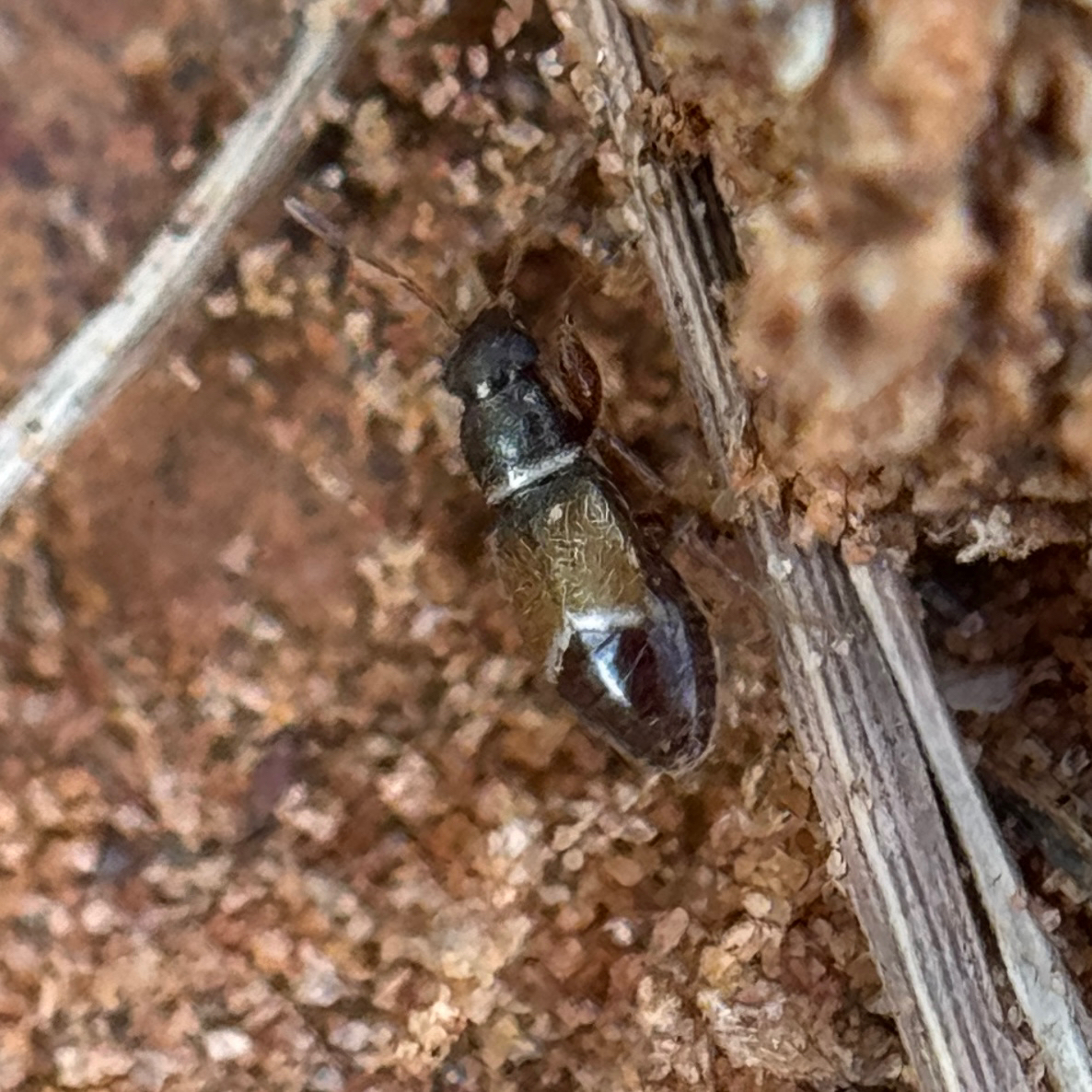
- Neosuris castanea

Scientific classification
- Kingdom: Animalia
- Phylum: Arthropoda
- Class: Insecta
- Order: Hemiptera
- Suborder: Heteroptera
- Family: Rhyparochromidae
- Subfamily: Rhyparochrominae
- Tribe: Udeocorini
- Genus: Neosuris; Barber, 1924

= Neosuris =

Genus of true bugs

Neosuris is a genus of dirt-colored seed bugs in the family Rhyparochromidae. There are at least three described species in Neosuris.

== Species ==
These three species belong to the genus Neosuris:

- Neosuris castanea (Barber, 1911)
- Neosuris fulgidus (Barber, 1918)
- Neosuris intermedius Brailovsky, 1978
