= Sigismund Löw =

German-American civil engineer and civic leader

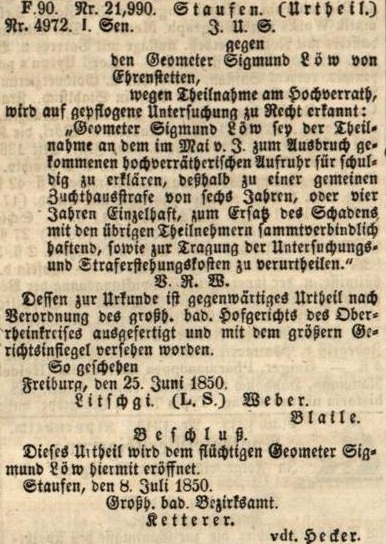
Notice of judgment against Sigmund Löw

Sigismund Low (also known as Sigmund Löw in his youth) was a German-American civil engineer and civic leader. He was born in Ehrenstetten, Grand Duchy of Baden on 25 November 1825 and died in Pittsburgh on 3 February 1898.

== German origins ==
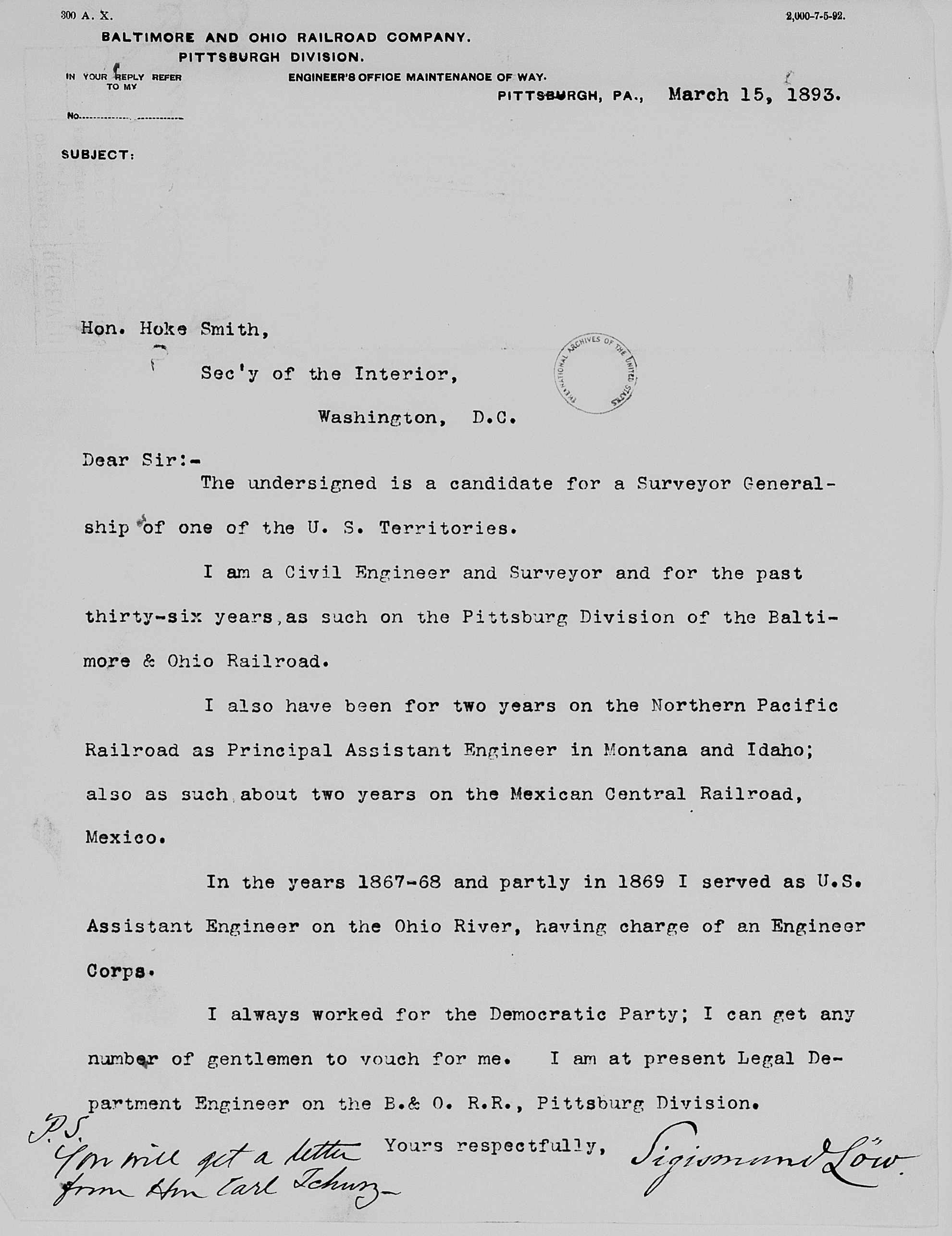
Sigismund Low's letter to U.S. Secretary of Interior applying for New Mexico Surveyor General position, in which he detailed his experience on Baltimore and Ohio Railroad stationery

Low studied at the Karlsruhe Polytechnic and graduated in 1848, having passed the state Geometer (surveyor) examination. Along with some classmates, he participated in the Baden Revolution in 1849 against the ruling Grand Ducal regime. As major he led a battalion of local civilian militia fighting against the Prussian army at battles at Waghäusel and Kuppenheim. Captured at the last siege of Rastatt, he escaped to Switzerland with the help of friends from his college days and emigrated to America in 1850. (Also see Forty-Eighters.) For his role in the revolution, he was sentenced to six years of prison (or four years of solitary confinement) in absentia.

== Engineering career ==
Upon arrival in America, he applied his surveying expertise in the development of several railroads over the next several decades. Low was an engineer responsible for surveying and construction of the Pittsburgh and Connellsville Railroad (P&C), which was staffed and financed by the Baltimore and Ohio Railroad and ultimately absorbed into it. The P&C was an important stimulant to the economic growth of western Pennsylvania by offering an alternative to the Pennsylvania Railroad, which often engaged in monopolistic practices. Leading the effort to complete the Sand Patch Tunnel, a nearly mile-long stretch at the top of the Appalachians, brought Low widespread notice.

In Germany before coming to America, Low had undertaken surveys of the Rhine. After promotion to Master of Road at P&C in 1866, Low was called into service as assistant civil engineer for the U.S. War Department, working under W. Milnor Roberts, and spent the next two years leading surveys of two sections of the Ohio River (Clipper Mills, Ohio to Cincinnati, Ohio and Evansville, Indiana to Cairo, Illinois). The surveys enabled the federal government to plan the mighty river's commercial development and management of its flooding.

After completion of the surveying he returned to the P&C/B&O for the rest of his career, with breaks involving projects with the Northern Pacific in the Yellowstone area (again with Roberts) in 1871-72 and the Mexican Central in 1881–82. In 1886 Low returned to Mexico to work with civil engineer James Buchanan Eads and his partner Colonel James Andrews on the proposed railway system across the Isthmus of Tehuantepec.

== Civic leadership ==
Having previously been affiliated with Democrats, in February 1856 Low served as a delegate for Pennsylvania at the first national convention of the Republican Party in Pittsburgh. He and Charles Thumm represented German citizens opposed to slavery.

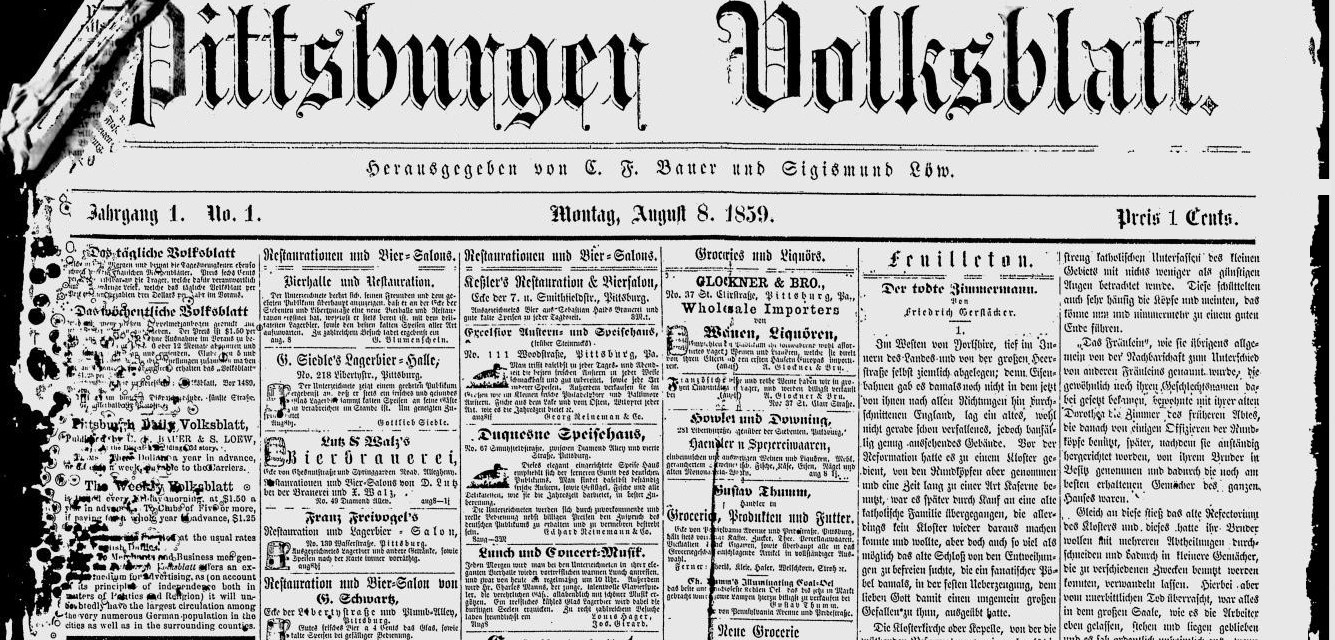
Masthead of first issue of Pittsburger Volksblatt

Löw was a founder of the Pittsburger Volksblatt, a German language newspaper, established in 1859. During his work travels in Montana, Utah, and Mexico, he shared some of his experiences and observations in letters to the editor; these accounts were published by other German language papers across the country as well as in Germany.

As the Confederate army began marching north in 1863, Pennsylvanians grew concerned over invasion. Low developed plans for and oversaw construction of a major fortification on Squirrel Hill in Pittsburgh.

He was elected to the Pittsburgh Select City Council for the 3rd ward unopposed in 1866 and served into 1868.
