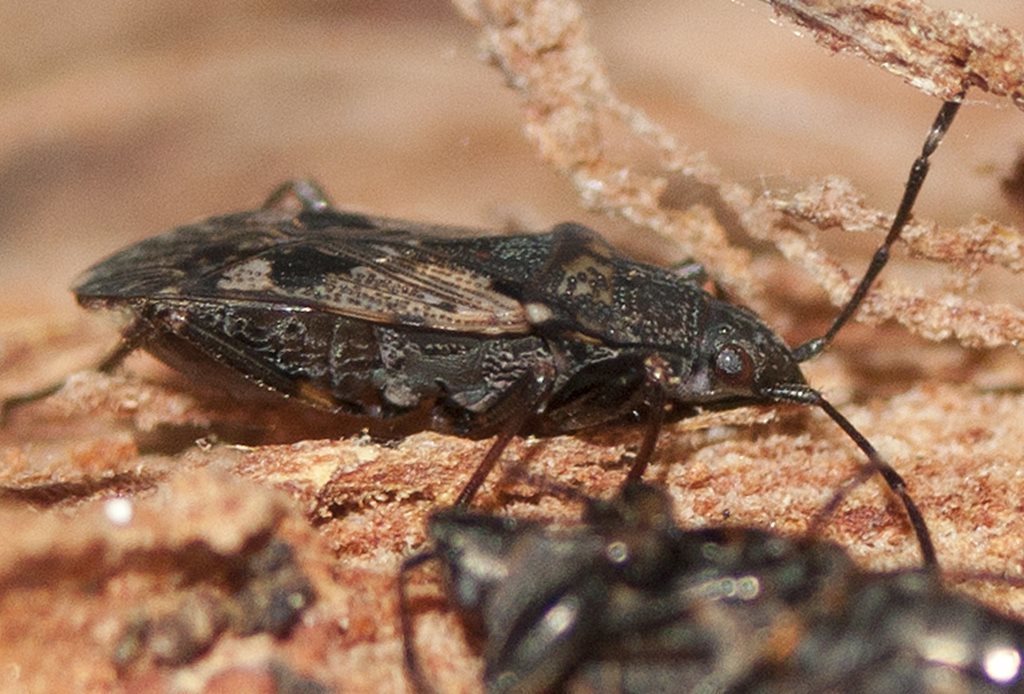
- Euander lacertosus, strawberry bug, Australia

Scientific classification
- Domain: Eukaryota
- Kingdom: Animalia
- Phylum: Arthropoda
- Class: Insecta
- Order: Hemiptera
- Suborder: Heteroptera
- Family: Rhyparochromidae
- Subfamily: Rhyparochrominae
- Tribe: Udeocorini
- Genus: Euander; Stal, 1865

= Euander =

Genus of insects

Euander is a genus of dirt-colored seed bugs in the family Rhyparochromidae. There are at least four described species in Euander, found in Australia.

== Species ==
These four species belong to the genus Euander:

- Euander cicero Gross, 1962
- Euander lacertosus (Erichson, 1842) (strawberry bug)
- Euander multicolorata (Distant, 1918)
- Euander torquatus (Erichson, 1842)
