= Karl Heinzen =

German-born American journalist

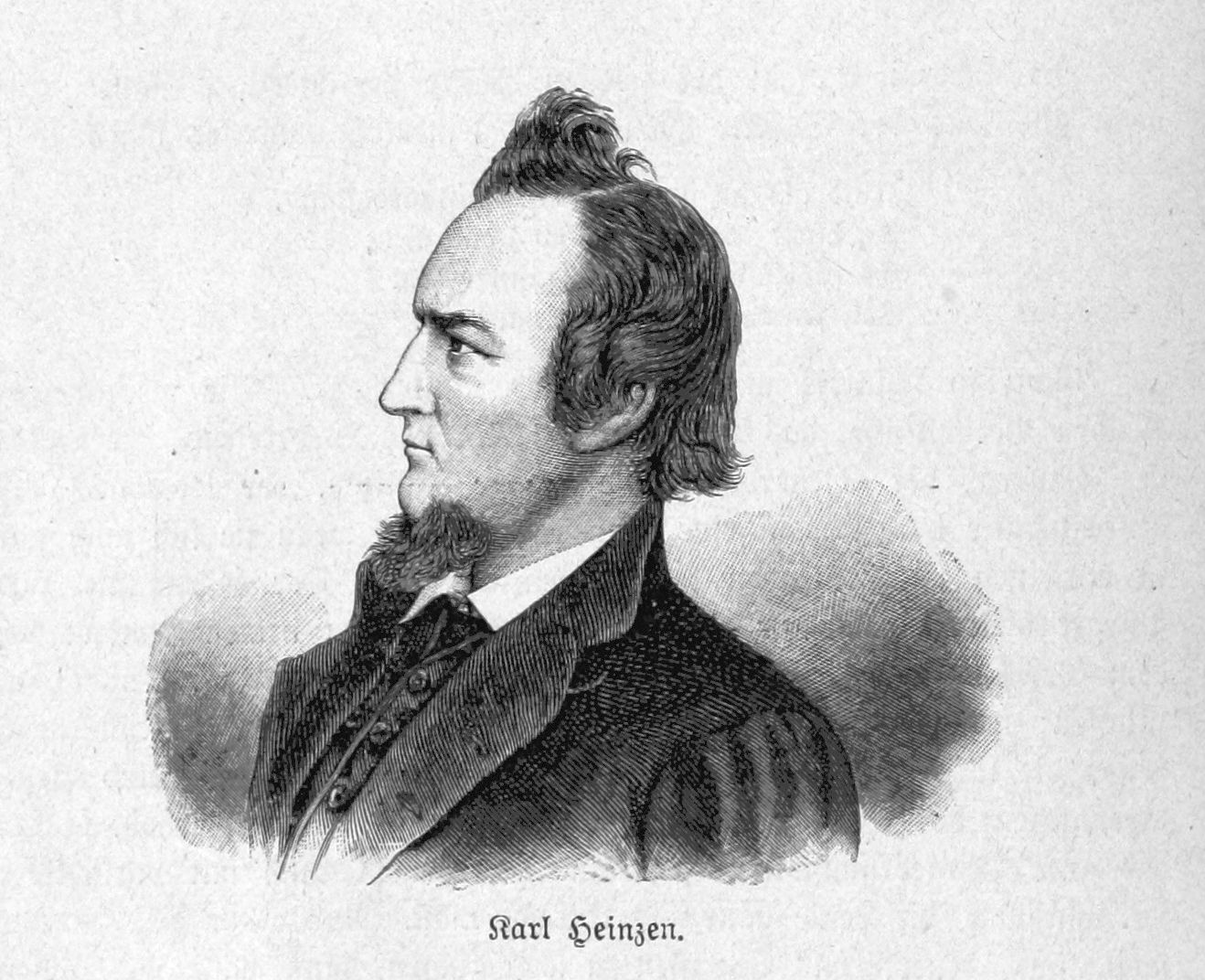
Karl Heinzen. Illustration by Otto Emil Lau.

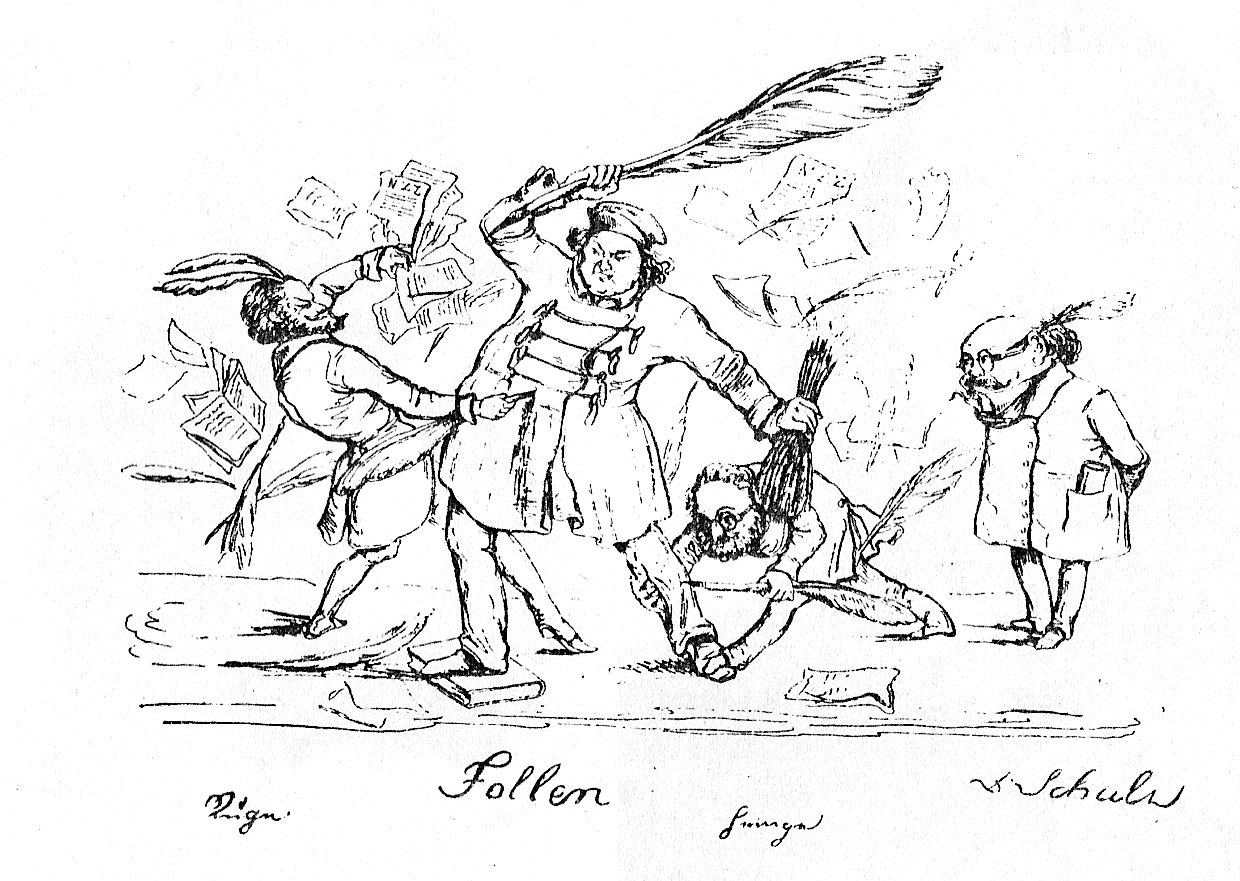
The Zurich Atheism Dispute of 1846 (Left to right: Ruge, Follen, Heinzen, Schulz). Caricature by an unknown artist.

Karl Peter Heinzen (22 February 1809 – 12 November 1880) was a revolutionary author who resided mainly in Germany and the United States. He was one of the German Forty-Eighters. He advocated terrorist violence against ruling dynasties and uninvolved civilian populations as a means to an end.

== Biography ==
He was born in Grevenbroich and attended the gymnasium in Kleve. In 1827, he began the study of medicine at the University of Bonn. He was expelled for a rebellious speech and went to the Netherlands where he was recruited for its Indonesian colonies and shipped out as a subaltern to Jakarta. He later (1841) wrote a book on his trip and what he found there: Reise nach Batavia (Voyage to Jakarta). He didn't find the colony suitable for permanent residence, and returned home in 1831.

After he had fulfilled his military service obligation, he worked a short time as a salesman and then as a tax man. After eight years, he became an executive functionary for the Rhenish railroad in Cologne and later part of the administration of a fire-insurance association in Aachen. He devoted his leisure time to writing. Besides the travel book, he published a book of poems (1841; reprinted in Boston, 1867), and after those involved himself in political writings. Two pamphlets, Die Ehre (Honor) and Die geheimen Konduitenlisten (Secret Lists of Leaders), undertook an objective criticism of the measures of the Prussian government. His tone was sharper in contributions he made to two newspapers, the Leipziger Allgemeine Zeitung and the Rheinische Zeitung.

The banning of these newspapers from Prussia prompted him to write Die preußische Bureaukratie (The Prussian Bureaucracy) which was confiscated immediately on its appearance and led to a criminal investigation. Heinzen fled to Belgium to escape prosecution and in March 1845 began a series of socialist writings with Steckbrief, an indictment of the higher courts of the Prussian Rhine Province. These writings were distributed throughout Germany. In 1846, he moved to Switzerland, first to Zurich, then to Bern, Basel and Genf. All showed him the door, and in the winter of 1847/48 he left for the United States.

In 1848, Karl Marx published a critique of Heinzen's thought on the topics of morality and dignity. Whereas Heinzen appealed to these concepts, which he found useful for socialist ends, Marx rejected their use as he thought moral arguments against capitalism to be incompatible with scientific socialism, and because he believed the existing vocabulary of morality was compromised by its use in support of capitalism. Marx argued that Heinzen was mistaken in conceiving of morality as ahistorical rather than as a contingent phenomenon emerging from social and economic relationships.

When he heard about the February revolution in France, Heinzen immediately returned to Europe and took active part in the activity in Germany. He organized an armed incursion of volunteers from France and Switzerland into Baden. After the uprising in Baden was suppressed in 1849, he fled to Switzerland, and then went back to the United States again, via London. In New York City, for a time he edited the Schellpost, a paper founded by Eichthal. In 1853, he went to Louisville, Kentucky, where he founded the newspaper Pionier. He put this out for over a quarter of a century, writing most of it himself. German radicalism, of which he was one of the pillars, was the recipient of sharp and bitter satire within its pages.

In March 1854, he, Bernhard Domschke, and others deliberated on a statement of principles of the radical Germans which became known in German-American circles as the "Louisville Platform." It denounced slavery, the Fugitive Slave Law, clericalism and isolationism; it advocated free land for genuine settlers, equal rights for African-Americans and women, easier access to citizenship, federally sponsored internal improvements, penal reform, judicial reform, educational reform. In addition, it advocated the abolition of the office of the President of the United States and the United States Senate and favored a unicameral system with an executive council closely overseen by the legislature.

Heinzen stood almost alone in the German-language press in his advocacy of women's rights. He furthered the cause by using the nom de plume Lousie Mayen in addressing Arnold Ruge and his position on women's suffrage. German papers occasionally noted feminist lectures of Mathilde Franziska Anneke, but aside from the Neue Zeit of St. Louis (George Schneider's short-lived paper) and Heinzen's Pionier, most German-language newspapers condemned the movement. Forty-Eighters like Reinhold Solger, Christian Esselen and Friedrich Hecker thought suffrage for women would set back culture a century. Heinzen was also an isolated voice in the German-language press which defended the legality of the Grant administration's sale of surplus arms to France during the Franco-Prussian War.

In 1859, he and the Pionier moved to Boston which he regarded as the most culturally advanced city in the United States. The paper had a limited circulation, probably never more than 5,000. Heinzen shrugged off German-born Bostonian's complaints about its lack of coverage of local news. About five-sixths of the circulation went out of town. In its pages could be found reports from many fields of human endeavor. William Lloyd Garrison praised it highly.

Illness obligated him to abandon the paper in 1879. In addition to his political writings and poetry, he wrote some comedies. He is buried in Forest Hills Cemetery.
