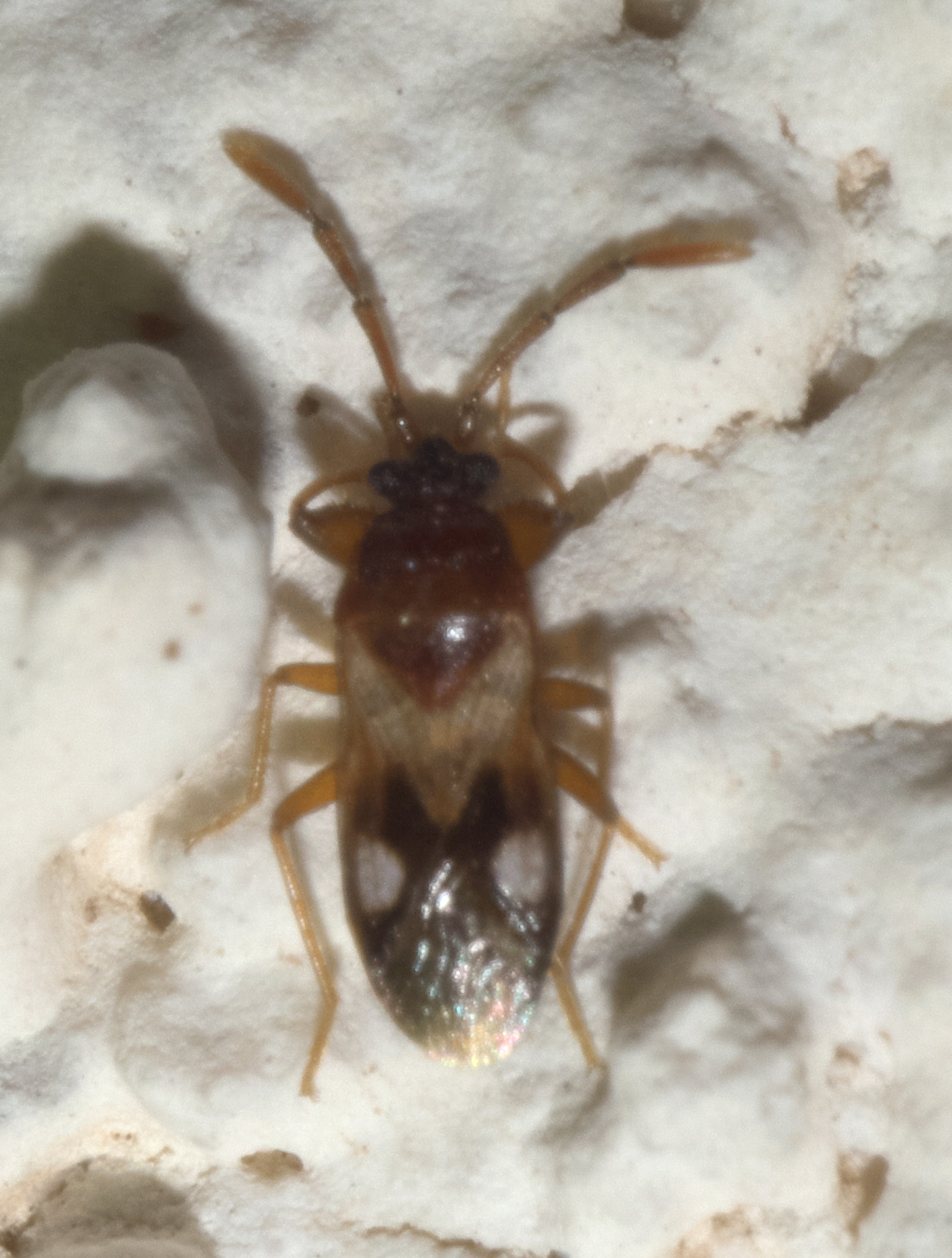
- Tempyra biguttula

Scientific classification
- Kingdom: Animalia
- Phylum: Arthropoda
- Clade: Pancrustacea
- Class: Insecta
- Order: Hemiptera
- Suborder: Heteroptera
- Family: Rhyparochromidae
- Subfamily: Rhyparochrominae
- Tribe: Udeocorini
- Genus: Tempyra; Stål, 1874

Type species
- Tempyra biguttula Stål, 1974

Synonyms
- Epelytes Kirkaldy, 1910

= Tempyra =

Genus of true bugs

Tempyra is a genus of dirt-colored seed bugs in the family Rhyparochromidae. There are at least two described species in Tempyra.

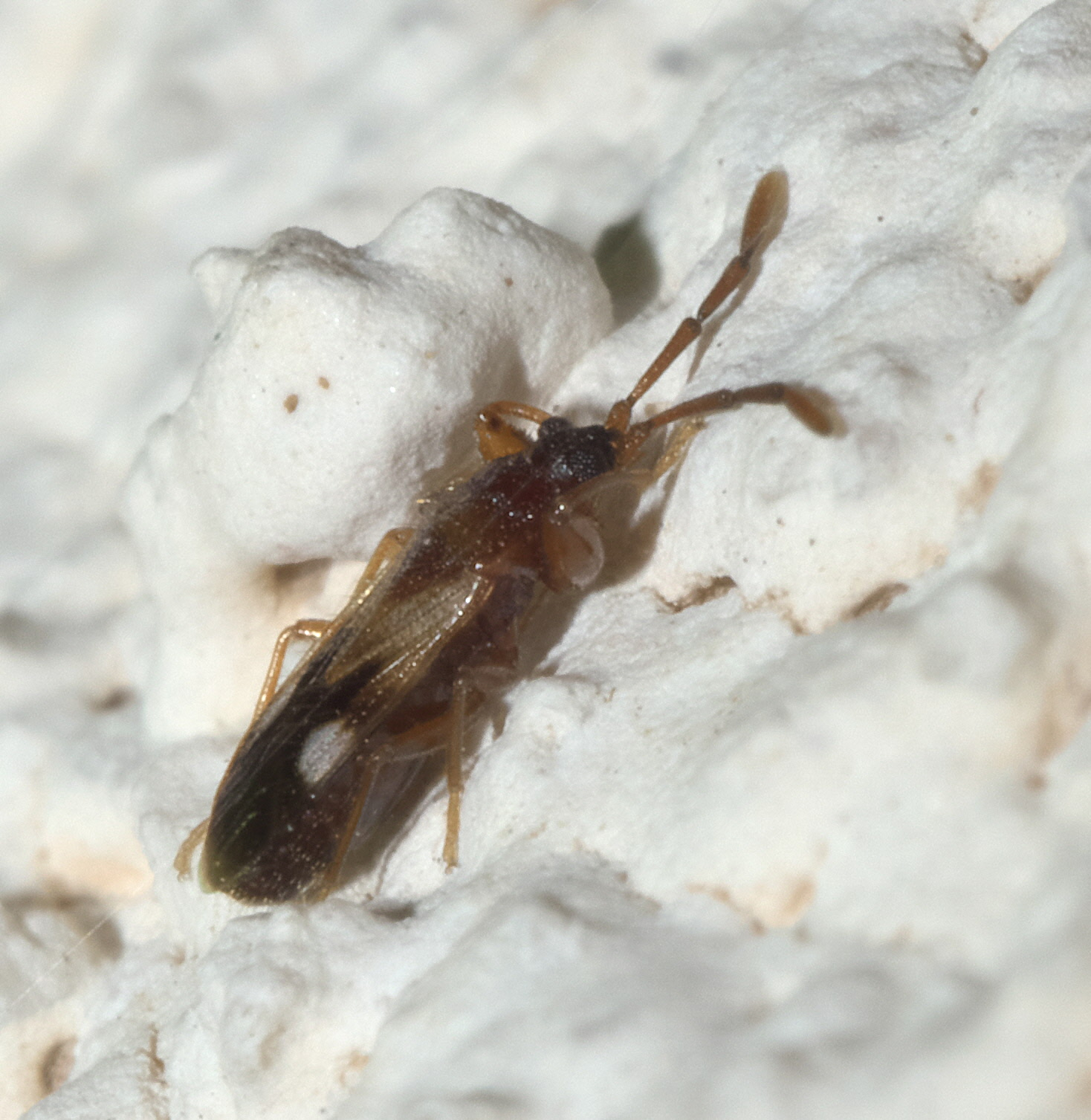
Tempyra biguttula

== Species ==
These two species belong to the genus Tempyra:

- Tempyra biguttula Stal, 1874
- Tempyra testacea Barber, 1948
