= Volksblatt und Freiheits-Freund =

German-language newspaper of Pittsburgh, Pennsylvania, United States

- Type: Daily German-language newspaper
- Founded: 1901
- Language: German
- Ceased publication: 1942
- Headquarters: Pittsburgh, Pennsylvania

The Volksblatt und Freiheits-Freund was the leading German-language newspaper in Pittsburgh, Pennsylvania, during its publication from 1901 to 1942. It was formed from the merger of two predecessors, the Freiheits-Freund and Pittsburger Volksblatt.

== Predecessors ==
=== Freiheits-Freund ===
The Freiheits-Freund ("Freedom's Friend") was founded as a weekly newspaper in 1834 by Henry Ruby, with Victor Scriba as editor, in Chambersburg, Pennsylvania. Scriba relocated it from there to Pittsburgh in 1837 after buying out Ruby. Content of the paper included news from Europe and the United States, local news, and a literary (feuilleton) section. By 1850, the Freiheits-Freund was a daily paper owned by cousins Louis Neeb and William Neeb, who had been employed by the paper since its early days. The Neebs brought increased attention to business and commercial news. Because of its strong opposition to slavery, the paper aligned itself with the Republican Party when that party first organized.

In 1860 the Freiheits-Freund merged with the Pittsburgher Courier, a newspaper founded in 1843 by John G. Backofen with a Democratic party orientation, which absorbed the Whig-supporting West Pennsylvania Staats Zeitung in 1854. Earlier Backofen had been a founder of Adler des Westens (Eagle of the West) in 1835.

=== Volksblatt ===
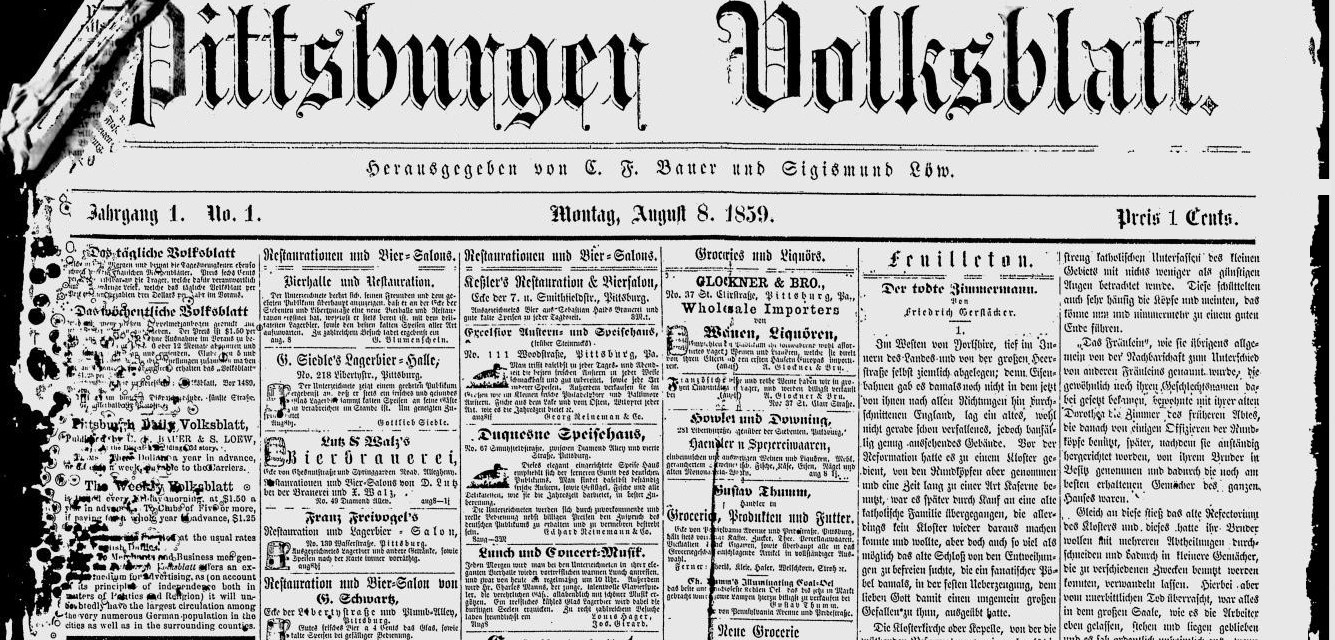
Masthead of the first issue of the Pittsburger Volksblatt

Karl Friedrich Bauer and Sigismund Löw, Forty-Eighters who fled the German states after the failed revolutions of 1848, founded the Pittsburger Volksblatt ("People's Paper") in 1859. Bauer left the editorial office of the Freiheits-Freund and found a partner in Löw, a civic-minded engineer and delegate to the first national Republican Party convention held in Pittsburgh in 1856. Courier-founder John G. Backofen was part of the ownership group from 1861 to 1863. Bauer remained an owner of the Volksblatt until 1885, when he left to join the Milwaukee Herold. With the support of Pittsburgh businessman Max Schamberg, American consul to Austria, Bauer's interest in the Volksblatt was acquired by the brothers Isaac E. and Louis Hirsch and associates, under whose leadership the paper gained an increasing share of the market formerly dominated by the Freiheits-Freund.

== Merged publication ==
The Freiheits-Freund and Volksblatt served the German-speaking population of Pittsburgh until, in February 1901, the consolidation of the two papers and the founding of the Neeb-Hirsch Publishing Company took place. Thereafter, the papers were published as one under the title Volksblatt und Freiheits-Freund.

During World War I, the paper successfully withstood a swell of anti-German sentiment that caused many other German-American papers to succumb to circulation and advertising losses. Its survival has been credited to its pro-American reputation and major urban location.

Before the U.S. entered World War II, the paper took a denunciatory stance toward the German American Bund, a pro-Nazi organization in the United States. By this time, the paper was facing a scarcity of local German speakers, and in 1942, amid another unfavorable wartime cultural climate, the paper folded.
