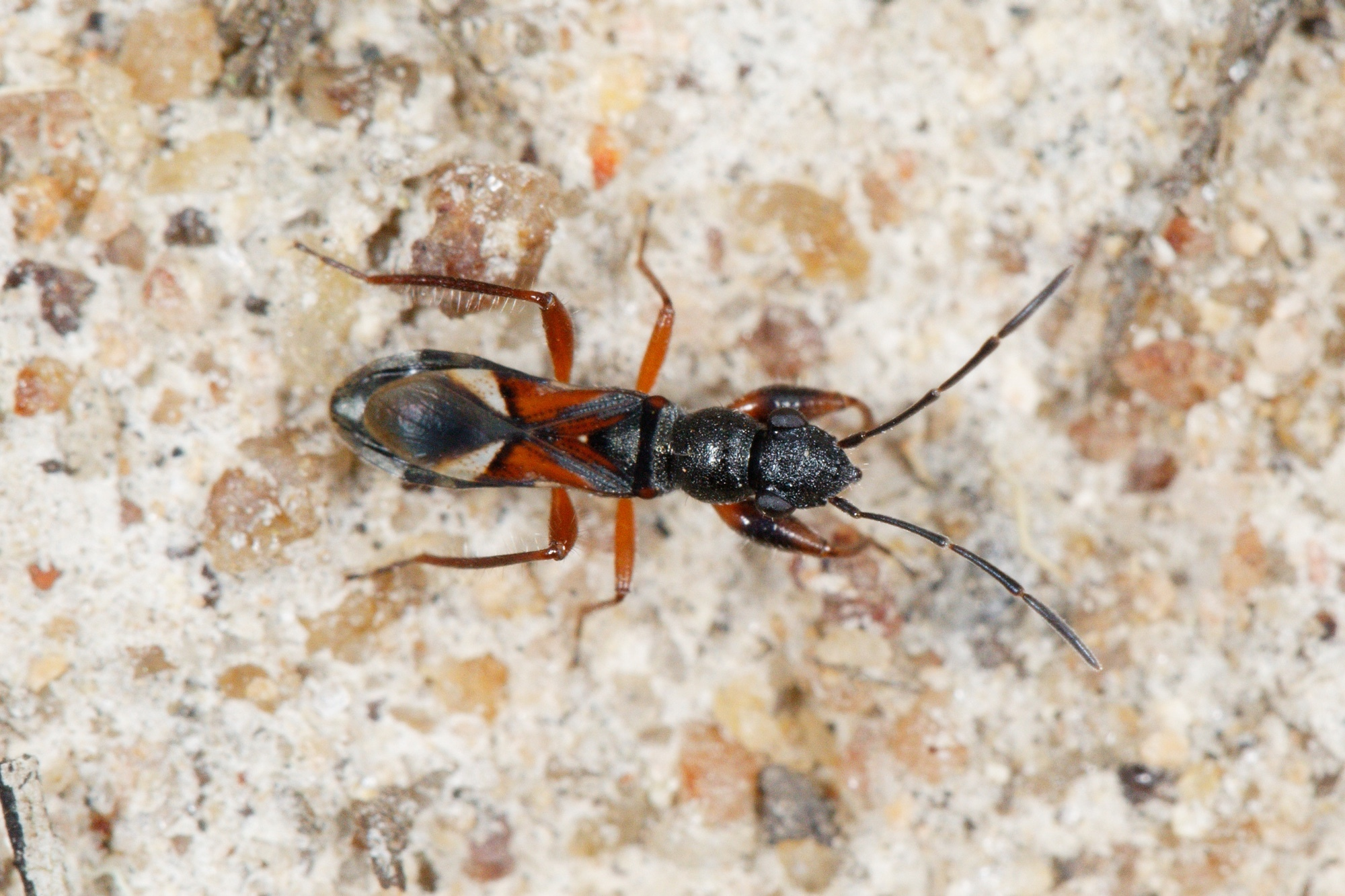
- Daerlac cephalotes, Australia

Scientific classification
- Domain: Eukaryota
- Kingdom: Animalia
- Phylum: Arthropoda
- Class: Insecta
- Order: Hemiptera
- Suborder: Heteroptera
- Family: Rhyparochromidae
- Subfamily: Rhyparochrominae
- Tribe: Udeocorini
- Genus: Daerlac; Signoret, 1881

= Daerlac =

Genus of insects

Daerlac is a genus of dirt-colored seed bugs in the family Rhyparochromidae. There are at least four described species in Daerlac, found mainly in Australia.

== Species ==
These four species belong to the genus Daerlac:

- Daerlac apicalis (Distant, 1904)
- Daerlac cephalotes (Dallas, 1852)
- Daerlac nigricans Distant, 1918
- Daerlac picturatus (Distant, 1904)
