= Karl Hermann Berendt =

German-American linguist (1817–1878)

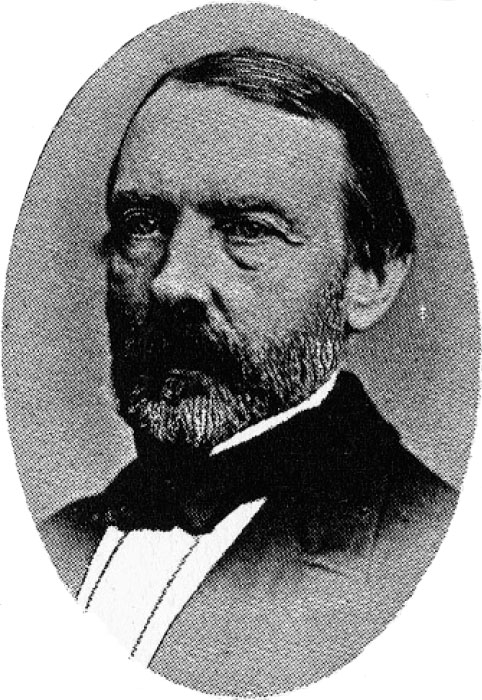
- From Brinton, Daniel G. (1900). Catalogue of the Berendt Linguistic Collection. Philadelphia: Dept. of Archaeology and Paleontology, University of Pennsylvania.
- Born: November 12, 1817
- Died: May 12, 1878 (aged 60)

Karl Hermann Berendt (November 12, 1817 in Danzig – May 12, 1878 in Guatemala City) was a German-American medical doctor, collector, explorer and investigator of Mesoamerican linguistics.

== Biography ==
He studied at various German universities, receiving his degree of M.D. at the University of Königsberg in 1842. In 1843, he began practice at Breslau and also acted as Privatdozent in surgery and obstetrics at the University of Breslau. In 1848 he was a member of the Vorparlament at Frankfurt.

His political sympathies forced him to move to America in 1851. He proceeded from New York City to Nicaragua, and spent two years in the study of the ethnography, geography, and natural history of that region. Two years later he moved to Orizaba, Mexico, and thence to Veracruz, where he remained from 1855 to 1862. He then gave up medicine and devoted himself to natural science, linguistics, and ethnology, paying special attention to the Mayan tribes. He spent a year in Tabasco, and then came in 1863 to the United States.

In the United States, he devoted the greater part of the following year in copying manuscripts in the library of John Carter Brown. At the request of the Smithsonian Institution, he visited Yucatan. The results of this visit are published in its report for 1867. In 1869 he explored the ruins of ancient Centla, in the plains of Tabasco. He visited the United States several times between this date and 1876, his last visit.

In 1874 he settled at Cobán, Vera Paz, partly to study the Maya dialects of the region and partly to raise tobacco. At the request of the Berlin museum he spent a winter in securing and forwarding the sculptured slabs of Santa Lucía Cotzumalguapa, Guatemala, but an attack of fever terminated his work.

== Works ==
He contributed many articles in English, German, and Spanish to such works as Petermann's Mittheilungen (Communications) and the Deutsch-Amerikanisches Conversations-Lexicon (German-American Encyclopedia). Much of his work is unpublished, some manuscripts being in the National Anthropological Archives in Washington, D.C., and others deposited in the University of Pennsylvania Museum library as part of the Daniel Garrison Brinton bequest. Among Berendt's published works are:

- Analytical Alphabet for the Mexican and Central American Languages (New York, 1869)
- Los escritos de D. Joaquin Garcia Icazbalceta (Mérida, 1870)
- Los trabajos linguisticos de Don Pio Perez (Mexico, 1871)
- Cartilla en lengua Maya (Mérida, 1871)
- "On a Grammar and Dictionary of the Carib or Karif Language," in the Smithsonian report for 1873
- "Die Indianer des Isthmus von Tehuantepec" in Zeitschrift für Ethnologie, 1873
- "The Darien Language" in the American Historical Record, 1874
