= Fritz Müller =

German-Brazilian biologist (1822–1897)

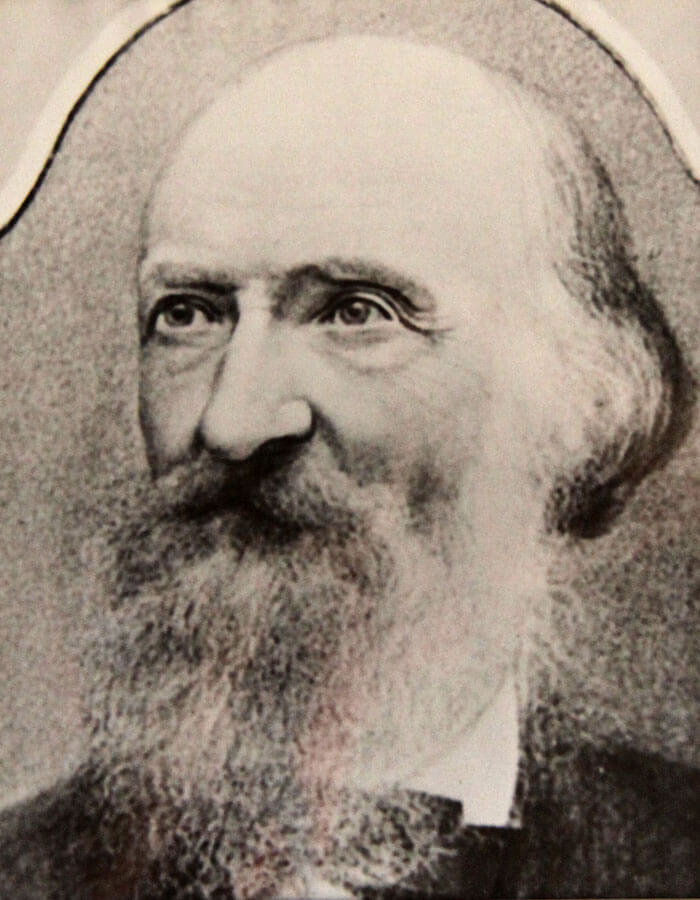
- Born: 31 March 1822; Windischholzhausen, Erfurt, Thuringia, Kingdom of Prussia
- Died: 21 May 1897 (aged 75); Blumenau, Brazil
- Education: University of Berlin
- Known for: Müllerian mimicry
- Scientific career
- Fields: Biology

Johann Friedrich Theodor Müller (German pronunciation: [ˈjoːhan ˈfʁiːdʁɪç ˈteːodoːɐ̯ ˈmʏlɐ]; 31 March 1822 – 21 May 1897), better known as Fritz Müller (Brazilian Portuguese: [ˈfɾits ˈmileʁ]), and also as Müller-Desterro, was a German biologist who emigrated to southern Brazil, where he lived in and near the city of Blumenau, Santa Catarina. There he studied the natural history of the Atlantic forest and was an early advocate of Darwinism. Müllerian mimicry is named after him.

== Life ==
Müller was born in the village of Windischholzhausen, near Erfurt in Thuringia, Germany, the son of a minister. Müller had what would be seen today as a normal scientific education at the universities of Berlin (earning a BSc in Botany) and Greifswald, culminating in a PhD in Biology. He subsequently decided to study medicine. As a medical student, he began to question religion and in 1846 became an atheist, joining the Free Congregations and supporting free love. Despite completing the course, he did not graduate because he refused to swear the graduation oath, which contained the phrase "so help me God and his sacred Gospel".

Müller was disappointed by the failure of the Prussian Revolution in 1848, fearing implications for his life and career. As a result, he emigrated to Brazil in 1852, with his brother August and their wives, to join Hermann Blumenau's new colony in the State of Santa Catarina. In Brazil, Müller became a farmer, doctor, teacher and biologist. During this time, he studied the natural history of the sub-tropical Atlantic forest, around the Itajaí River valley.

Müller gained an official teaching post, and spent a decade teaching mathematics at a college in Desterro. The college was taken over by the Jesuits, and Müller (though retaining his salary) returned to the Itajaí River valley. He negotiated a number of botanical activities with the provincial government and spent the next nine years doing botanical research and advising farmers. In 1876 he was appointed as a Travelling Naturalist to the National Museum in Rio de Janeiro.

In his retirement years, Müller received many offers of support and offers of financial help. He was one of many naturalists to visit and work in South America during the nineteenth century, but was the only one to settle in Brazil for the rest of his life. A statue of Müller was erected in Blumenau in 1929.

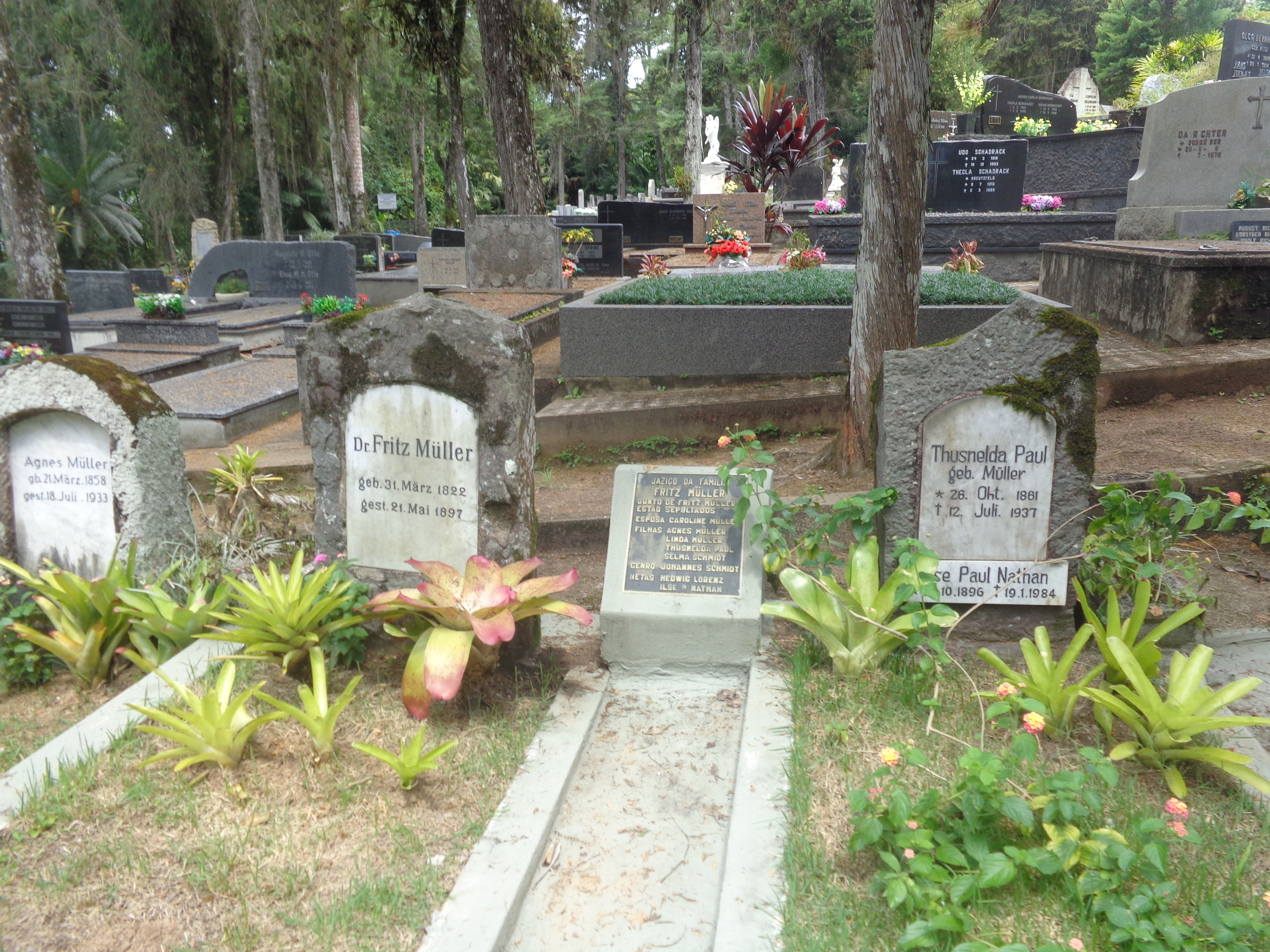
Müller's grave in Blumenau's Lutheran Cemetery

== Biology ==
During his life Müller published over 70 papers in English and Portuguese, and also in German-language periodicals. The topics covered a range of natural topics from entomology, marine biology and botany.

Müllerian mimicry is named after and discovered by him. This phenomenon concerns the resemblance between two or more unpalatable species which are protected from predators capable of learning. The protection is often a noxious chemical, perhaps gained from the larva eating a particular plant; or it may be a sting or other defence. It is an advantage for such potential prey to advertise their status in a way clearly perceptible to their predators; this is called aposematic or warning coloration. The principle is of wide application, but in Müller's case the prey were butterflies, and the predators usually birds or reptiles.

In Müllerian mimicry, an advantage is gained when unpalatable species resemble each other, especially when the predator has a good memory for colour (as birds, for instance, do have). Thus one trial may work to dissuade a bird from several species of butterfly which all have the same warning coloration. Müller and other naturalists believed that such systems of mimicry could only come about by means of natural selection, and all of them wrote about it.

Another of Müller's discoveries were the Müllerian bodies in the flowering plant genus Cecropia. Müller was able to show that the small bodies at the petiole-bases of Cecropia are food bodies and are used by protecting ants of the genus Azteca which inhabit the hollow stems of these fast growing trees.

Much of Müller's botany was stimulated by the series of botanical works published by Darwin. After Darwin's Fertilisation of Orchids (1862) he spent years of work on orchids, sending observations to his brother Hermann and to Darwin. Darwin used some of this work in his second edition of 1877, and Hermann later became famous for his work on pollination. On Climbing plants (1867) Müller lent a letter to Darwin listing 40 genera of climbing plants classified by their method of climbing. The next few months saw more observations, which Darwin had translated and published as Müller's first paper in English. As a botanist, Fritz Müller is denoted by the author abbreviation F.J.Müll. when citing a botanical name.

=== Müller and Darwin ===
Müller became a strong supporter of Charles Darwin. He wrote Für Darwin in 1864, arguing that Darwin's theory of evolution by natural selection was correct, and that Brazilian crustaceans and their larvae could be affected by adaptations at any growth stage. Müller sent a copy to Darwin, who had the book privately translated for his own use. A later translation into English, with some additional material by Müller, was made by W.S. Dallas, and was published as Facts and Arguments for Darwin in 1869.

Extensive correspondence exists between Müller and Darwin, and Müller also corresponded with his brother Hermann Müller, Alexander Agassiz, Ernst Krause and Ernst Haeckel.

== Biographies ==
- Alfred Möller, 1920. Fritz Müller. Werke, Briefe und Leben [virtually the sole biographical source for this significant biologist]
- Cezar Zillig, 1997. Dear Mr. Darwin. A intimidade da correspondência entre Fritz Müller e Charles Darwin. Sky/Anima Comunicação e Design, São Paulo, 241 pp. [letters between Müller and Darwin, with very interesting comments on the life of Fritz Müller. In Portuguese]
- Andreas Daum, Wissenschaftspopularisierung im 19. Jahrhundert: Bürgerliche Kultur, naturwissenschaftliche Bildung und die deutsche Öffentlichkeit, 1848–1914. Munich: Oldenbourg, 1998, ISBN 3-486-56337-8, [contains a short biography and much information on the contemporary context, including Darwinism in Germany, Haeckel, Krause, etc.]
- David A. West, 2003. Fritz Müller: A Naturalist in Brazil. Blacksburg: Pocahontas Press. ISBN 0-936015-92-6 [modern, and most welcome, though the biographical information rests almost entirely on Möller's book. West adds excellent summaries and assessments of Müller's biological work]
