= Heinrich Bernhard Oppenheim =

German publicist and philosopher

Heinrich Bernhard Oppenheim (July 20, 1819 in Frankfurt – March 29, 1880 in Berlin) was a German publicist and philosopher concerned with the ideas of liberalism, free trade and international law.

Oppenheim was son of a Jewish family of bankers in Frankfurt and studied law in Göttingen, Heidelberg and Berlin. In Berlin he could not reach a postdoctoral lecturer qualification because of his Jewish origin, so he became a private lecturer (Privatdozent) for political science and international law in Heidelberg. But his inclinations to journalism soon won the upper hand, and, his living assured by his family, he gave up teaching.

He was very much taken by the questions surrounding the movements of 1848. His feeble attempts at practical politics nevertheless foundered and left him more and more to make himself known through his pen and his theories. He spoke at the agitated mass meeting at Unter den Zelten where the legislature's petition to the king regarding the wishes of the people was discussed. He became one of the chief editors, with Arnold Ruge and Eduard Meyen, of “Die Reform” (The Reform) which soon came under the oversight of several democratic groups. Among his other co-workers on this paper were Mikhail Bakunin, Karl Heinzen and Georg Herwegh. Oppenheim sought a seat in the National Assembly. He thought it sufficient to refer to his writings in “Die Reform” where he developed his premise “that only with freedom did the people become mature enough for freedom,” but the people of Berlin had no patience with a candidate who campaigned only with his pen. This experience convinced him even more that he was suited to a writing career, as he did not seem suited to speaking.

He went to Baden and, looking for secrets, broke into the private files of the departed archduke. Lorenzo Brentano, the leader of the provisional government, put him in charge of the government newspaper, the “Karlsruher Zeitung”. When a schism broke out between Brentano's moderates and Gustav Struve's terrorists, Oppenheim worked for the latter, and was dismissed from the newspaper when they failed. He then traveled to Switzerland, France, the Netherlands and England. He returned in 1850 and continued to publish works on democratic ideas. He denounced the democrats for the victories of the Reaction, but thought the latter were ultimately to blame because they turned to raw despotic power rather than continuing with their phony constitutionalism.

In 1861 Oppenheim joined the German Progress Party and edited the Yearbook for Politics and Literature which was banned soon afterwards. He also became a member of the Congress of German Economists, as he was known as an excellent economist and supporter of free trade. He also paid attention to social matters.

The occurrences of 1866 worked a great transformation in Oppenheim. He greeted the new order with joy while other liberals were more skeptical. Oppenheim joined the National Liberals and supported Bismarck's strategy for national unification. He wrote two flyers for the elections, one of which only saw limited distribution since the leaders saw it as too radical. After 1870, for the first time he directly discussed practical questions, writing on poor laws and economics. He was also critical of “fanciful thinkers about the future among the teachers in the universities.”

In the 1874 election, he was elected Member of the Reichstag representing Reuß ä. L. and took his seat as an expert on the 1869 changes to commercial regulations. In 1877 he lost his seat to a social democrat. In reaction to Bismarck's protectionist policy he split with his party in 1880.

Oppenheim's philosophical work is concentrated on parliamentarism the idea of common welfare. He coined the phrase “lectern socialism” (German "Kathedersozialismus").

== See also ==
- Right Hegelians
