= Facts and Arguments for Darwin =

Book published in 1869

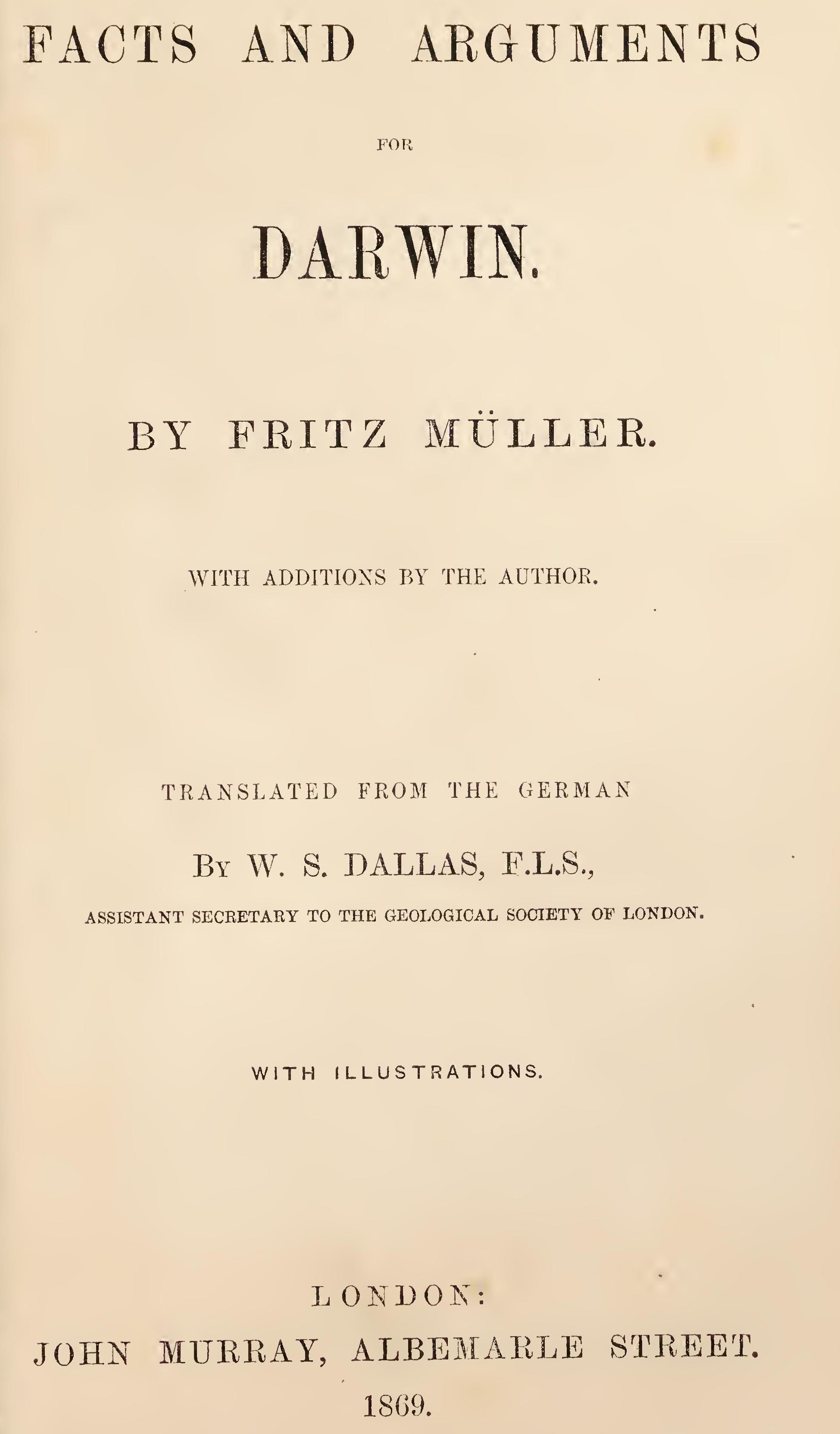
- Author: Fritz Müller
- Original title: Für Darwin
- Translator: William Sweetland Dallas
- Subject: evolutionary biology

Facts and Arguments for Darwin is an 1864 book on evolutionary biology by the German biologist Fritz Müller, originally published in German under the title Für Darwin ("For Darwin"), and translated into English by William Sweetland Dallas in 1869. Müller argued that Charles Darwin's theory of evolution by natural selection that he had advanced in his book The Origin of Species only five years earlier was correct, citing evidence that he had come across in Brazil.

Müller states in the 'Author's Preface':

It is not the purpose of the following pages to discuss once more the arguments deduced for and against Darwin's theory of the origin of species, or to weigh them one against the other. Their object is simply to indicate a few facts favourable to this theory, collected upon the same South American ground, on which, as Darwin tells us, the idea first occurred to him of devoting his attention to ‘the origin of species, — that mystery of mysteries.

It is only by the accumulation of new and valuable material that the controversy will gradually be brought into a state fit for final decision, and this appears to be for the present of more importance than a repeated analysis of what is already before us. Moreover, it is but fair to leave it to Darwin himself at first to beat off the attacks of his opponents from the splendid structure which he has raised with such a master-hand.
