= Charles Ansorge =

- Born: 1817
- Died: 1866 (aged 48–49)
- Occupations: musician; composer

Charles Ansorge (born in Spiller, Silesia, Germany, in 1817; died in Chicago, 28 October 1866) was a German-born musician and composer who, as a Forty-Eighter, emigrated to the United States and worked for a time there also.

== Biography ==
=== Germany ===
He was educated in Breslau, where he received high honors, and also obtained a thorough musical training. For some years after his graduation he devoted his attention to teaching, and was further occupied in editing a public newspaper. He subscribed to the liberal ideas prevalent in Germany during the Revolutions of 1848, and published articles offensive to the authorities, for which he was tried and sentenced to three years' imprisonment. But he escaped to England, where he was joined by his family.

=== United States ===
He sailed for the United States. He settled in Boston, and became organist and chorister of the First Church in Dorchester, where he remained for 13 years. He was also a teacher of music in the asylum for the blind in South Boston for four years. For some time he was a resident editor of the Massachusetts Teacher, and he took an active part in the state teachers' association.

In 1863 he moved to Chicago, where he died. His remains were interred in the Dorchester North Burying Ground.

== Notes ==
Attribution:
