= Niclas Müller =

American poet

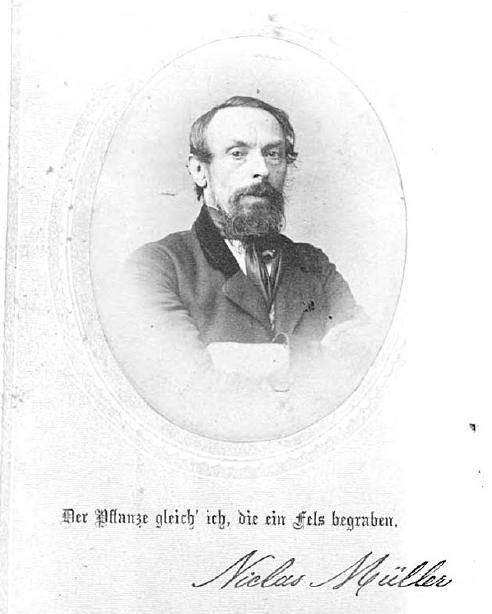

Niclas Müller (15 November 1809, in Langenau, near Ulm, Germany – 14 August 1875, in New York City) was a German-American poet.

== Biography ==
In 1823 he was apprenticed to a printer, and after learning this trade thoroughly settled in Stuttgart. Many of his poems appeared 1834–47 in Lieder eines Autodidakten, and a collection was published in 1837. He took part in the revolutionary movements of 1848, was forced to flee to Switzerland, and in 1853 came to New York City, where he bought a printing office. In the period of the Civil War, he published Zehn gepanzerte Sonette ("Ten armored sonnets", New York, 1862), and a volume of poems entitled Neuere Gedichte ("Latest poems", 1867). During the Franco-Prussian War he published a collection of patriotic poems, Frische Blätter auf die Wunden deutscher Krieger ("Fresh leaves on the wounds of German fighters"). In 1874 he retired from the printing business. At the time of his death, he was preparing a complete edition of his poems.

== The Paradise of Tears ==
William Cullen Bryant translated The Paradise of Tears by Nikolaus Muller.

Beside the River of Tears, with branches low,
And bitter leaves, the weeping-willows grow;
The branches stream like the dishevelled hair
Of women in the sadness of despair

On rolls the stream with a perpetual sigh;
The rocks moan wildly as it passes by;
Hyssop and wormwood border all the strand,
And not a flower adorns the dreary land.

Then comes a child, whose face is like the sun,
And dips the gloomy waters as they run,
And waters all the region, and behold
The ground is bright with blossoms manifold.

Where fall the tears of love the rose appears,
And where the ground is bright with friendship's tears,
Forget-me-not, and violets, heavenly blue,
Spring, glittering with the cheerful drops like dew.

The souls of mourners, all whose tears are dried,
Like swans, come gently floating down the tide,
Walk up the golden sands by which it flows,
And in that Paradise of Tears repose.

There every heart rejoins its kindred heart;
There in a long embrace that none may part,
Fulfilment meets desire, and that fair shore
Beholds its dwellers happy evermore.
