= Rudolf Dulon =

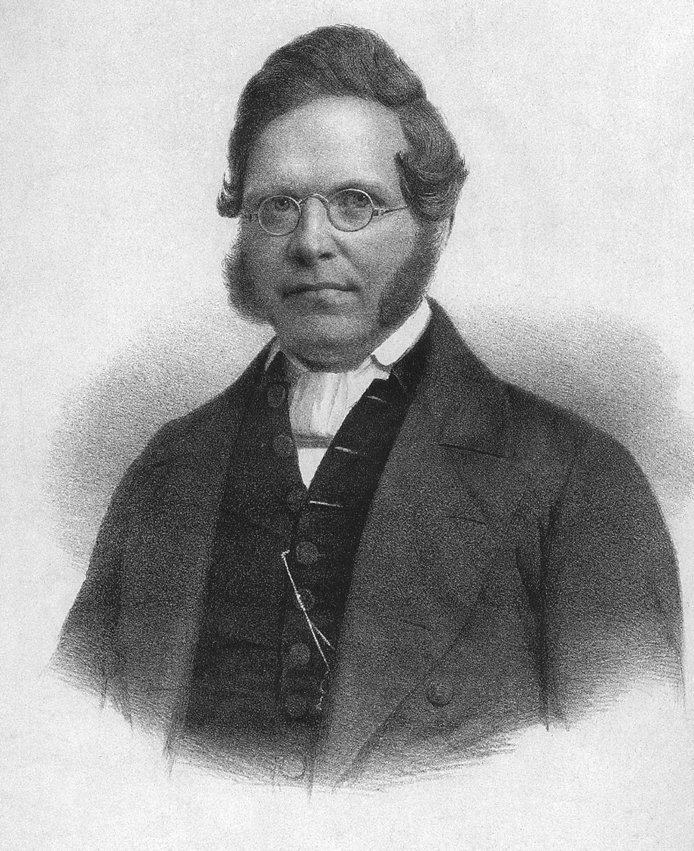
- Born: 30 April 1807; Stendal
- Died: 13 April 1870 (aged 62); Rochester
- Alma mater: Martin Luther University Halle-Wittenberg
- Occupation: Theologian

Christoph Joseph Rudolf Dulon (April 30, 1807 – April 13, 1870) was a pastor of the Reformed Church (Calvinist) and a socialist agitator in Bremen; later he was an educator in the United States.

== Life in Germany ==
Dulon was descended from a Huguenot family. After completing his time in the gymnasium, and philosophical and theological studies at the University of Halle, he was ordained in Magdeburg in 1836. He accepted pastorates at Flossau, near Osterberg. Even at this time, he put himself in opposition to Church authorities, but in so mild a way that they could be lenient. In 1843, Dulon left the Prussian state Evangelical Church to become pastor for a German Reformed congregation in Magdeburg.

His work as an agitator dates from this time. He worked together with the so-called Friends of the Light and the "Free Congregations," though without adopting their dogmas. What attracted him to them was their common fight against the validity of the articles of faith in the Reformed Church and the Catholicizing tendencies in the uniting Evangelical Church. He was reprimanded, but this only seemed to encourage him.

In 1848, a vote apparently excluded him from Bremen's Church of Our Lady (Liebfrauenkirche), where he had been preaching, but a majority of the congregation overturned the decision and installed him as pastor; and the Senate of Bremen, the city-state government and highest authority in the Bremen state church, intimidated by the upheavals of the time, dispensed with many of the initiation requirements only insisting on adherence to "the word of God." In undertaking his examination, Dulon explained that the Bible and God's word were for him two very different things. In November 1849 he protected the leftist Arnold Ruge, granting him church asylum from an impending arrest, and organised a further hiding place at Hermann Allmers's, before finding refuge in Brighton.

Followers streamed to him from all quarters and levels of society, and he moved to the front of the democratic movement. Democracy and revolution were to him the true Christianity. His sermons were characterized by their socialist content. He was strenuously opposed to the illiberal measures of the Friedrich Eichhorn, Prussian minister of cult and education. In 1850 he established the Bremen Tages-Chronik (Daily Chronicle), a social-democratic sheet - with Ruge contributing from abroad -, and Der Wecker. Ein Sonntagsblatt zur Beförderung des religiösen Lebens (The Alarmist. A Sunday paper for promoting the religious life), a religious weekly.

His string of victories became his fate. In 1851, his newspaper was forbidden in Prussia. The senate drew courage from the changing tenor of the times. In 1852, an intervention in Bremen was resolved upon by the German Confederation, and 10,000 troops stood on the outskirts of town. Dulon's days were numbered. Even in 1851, members of the Friends of the Light had complained to the senate, accusing him of denying essential articles of faith, mocking the gospel and open hostility to Christianity. The senate had referred the charges to theologians (Daniel Schenkel, Friedrich Wilhelm Carl Umbreit, and others) in Heidelberg who had confirmed the senate (though some thought deposing pastors was outside its jurisdiction) and declared Dulon unworthy of spiritual office in the Bremen Reformed state Church. Dulon was suspended, then dismissed and sentenced to six months in jail. He fled to Heligoland, which belonged to the United Kingdom at that time.

== Life in the United States ==
In 1853 he emigrated with his numerous family to the United States, where he supported himself by lecturing and teaching young people. He became the pastor of an independent congregation in New York City, and at the same time issued a series of “Sabbath Leaves” in the interests of free religion. He started the first German-American school in the United States. In 1855, he bought the Feldner School in New York City, and later, from 1866 until his death, directed the Realschule in Rochester, New York. Future Civil War general Franz Sigel, a Badensian, taught in Dr. Dulon's New York schools, and subsequently married one of his daughters. At the end of his life, Dulon published a book, The German School in America.

In the history of the Evangelical Church, there has hardly been another, except possibly Thomas Münzer, who has put religion in the service of revolutionary socialism so much as Rudolf Dulon.
