= William Dallas =

English zoologist (1824–1890)

William Sweetland Dallas FLS
- Born: 1824
- Died: 29 May 1890 (aged 65–66); Burlington House, Piccadilly, London
- Occupations: Zoologist; Museum curator

Academic work
- Institutions: Yorkshire Museum; British Museum

William Sweetland Dallas FLS (1824–1890) was a British zoologist who studied the insect collections at the British Museum, and served as an assistant secretary of the Geological Society of London and a Keeper of the museum of the Yorkshire Philosophical Society, apart from being an editor of the Popular Science Review as well as the Annals and Magazine of Natural History. He translated several biology books from German into English.

== Biography ==
Dallas was born in Islington on January 31, 1824, the son of William Dallas, a Scottish East India Merchant and member of Lloyds. Along with his brother he took an interest in natural history at an early age. He studied the classics at University College School and mastered French, German, and Italian. Later he acquired Danish, Swedish and Norwegian. When his father's business collapsed he along with his brothers John and James began to work. William found time to spend at the reading room of the British Museum after work. John Edward Gray encouraged the entomological interests of Dallas and he began to publish from 1847. Dallas was elected a member of the Linnean Society in 1849. He married Frances Esther, daughter of lawyer Liscombe Price in 1849. He was hired to catalogue the hemiptera in the British Museum from 1850 to 1852. Following the resignation of Edward Charlesworth, he was appointed Keeper of the Yorkshire Museum in 1858, at the age of 31. He lived in York with his wife, four sons and two daughters until 1868. Dallas was an editor and translator for the Zoological Record, the Annals and Magazine of Natural History and the Popular Science Review. In 1868 he was elected to the post of Assistant Secretary of the Geological Society following the resignation of H. M. Jenkins, resulting in his resignation from the role of Keeper.

Notably, he translated Facts and Arguments for Darwin by German biologist Fritz Müller and Erasmus Darwin by German biologist Ernst Krause into English. He also translated Karl Theodor Ernst von Siebold's Wahre Parthenogenesis bei Schmetterlingen und Bienen (1856) into English as On a true parthenogenesis in moths and bees and created the index for Charles Darwin's The Variation of Animals and Plants Under Domestication.

He died following paralysis at Burlington House, Piccadilly on 29 May 1890 and was buried at West Norwood Cemetery.
