= Reinhold Solger =

American poet

Reinhold Ernst Friedrich Karl Solger (5 July 1817 in Stettin – 11 January 1866 in Washington, D. C.) was an American historian, novelist, poet, political activist and lecturer. He was educated in Europe and emigrated to the United States where he was a noted lecturer in history and other scholarly topics.

== Early life and schooling ==
His father was a privy councilor in Stettin, and his family belonged to the upper echelons of the Prussian educated and civil service class in that city. His uncle was a noted philosopher and professor in Berlin. His father died when Solger was nine years old. This left the family financially dependent on the benevolence of relatives. He finished his preparatory schooling in Züllichau.

In 1837, he entered the University of Halle and joined the Arnold Ruge's intellectual circle, the Young Hegelians. He took full advantage of student life and the intellectual company. His studies first focussed on philosophy, laying the groundwork for his extensive education in the classics. He tried his hand at lyrical poetry, some of which was published in 1840 in Ruge's Musenalmanach.

By 1840, he had moved his studies to the University of Greifswald where he graduated in May 1842 with a historical dissertation on the Sicambri. His plan was to prepare himself to be a professor in the agricultural school in Eldena. The minister of culture for Prussia at that time was Eichhorn, who was a friend of his father's, took an interest in the career of the talented young man and found him a place in the civil service at Potsdam where Solger worked as an intern. Solger didn't find the bureaucratic life there satisfying. Under pressure from his creditors, and finding his relatives unhelpful, he decided to try his luck abroad.

== England ==
His first plan was to go to America via England, but he only made it as far as Liverpool, having given his last funds in exchange for a forged ticket which wasn't accepted for passage to America. Fortunately, he found a position as a tutor for a country gentleman in whose family he remained for almost four years. In these carefree and luxurious circumstances, he had time not only to master the English, but also to resume his historical and philosophical studies and devote himself to writing poetry more than his previous circumstances had permitted.

Among other works, the first two cantos of his comic epic Hans von Katzenfingen date from this time. It was a satire of the Prussian gentry, and never got beyond those two cantos. Its protagonist, Hans, showed how a young man could break through the superficial culture which surrounded him to successfully pursue his ideals. The two cantos were published anonymously in 1845 and 1846 in the Deutsches Taschenbuch aus der Schweiz and were much praised. Solger later explained much of the epic was rooted in the contrast between the stifling social atmosphere of Potsdam and the freer atmosphere he found in England.

== Germany and France ==
Solger left England in early 1847. He spent a few months in Paris, where he associated with personalities such as Mikhail Bakunin, Alexander Herzen, Georg Herwegh and Bernays, and then returned to Germany, settling in Heidelberg, where he shared his adventures in English and French culture with Friedrich Kapp. From there Solger left for Bruckberg to pay his respects to Ludwig Feuerbach. This meeting marked the start of an enduring intellectual exchange.

Solger continued on to Berlin where he hoped to found an independent literary or scholarly life. These plans didn't work out, and toward the end of 1847 he went back to Paris. The February–March Revolution in Paris surprised him a few days after his February 19 marriage to a young Parisian, Adèle Marie Bémere, in 1848. These February days he depicted compellingly in an article for a supplementary volume of Wigand's Konversations-Lexikon. He returned to Berlin in April 1848 and became a zealous member of a democratic club, though more as a spectator than as an agitator. Despite this, some officials saw in his direct arrival from Paris an importer of revolution.

Solger directed his political and literary efforts to the far left, and found himself in the Baden uprising. His skill in languages found him a role as interpreter for the chief of the Baden revolutionaries, Ludwig Mieroslawski. After two months, he fled with this army to Switzerland

== Switzerland ==
He first went to Bern where he gave a series of lectures on English literature in the winter of 1849-50. From there he went to Zurich and involved himself in journalism with contributions critically analyzing the defeated revolutionaries. He also produced a one-act burlesque called Der Reichstagsprofessor (The Professor in the Parliament) which drew on his experiences in the revolution. It provided much entertainment for the refugees in Switzerland who read it at their evening gatherings.

== London ==
Solger left Zurich for London via Paris in Summer 1852. In London, acquaintances such as Charles Dickens, Thomas Carlyle and Henry Bulwer, who had gotten to know him during his first visit to England, provided recommendations. A series of lectures in conjunction with Dickens wasn't successful. The pressure of the unusual number of refugees in London at that time presented significant difficulties, and Solger decided to emigrate to the United States in the spring of 1853.

== Boston ==
He arrived in Philadelphia and moved to the Roxbury neighborhood of Boston, Massachusetts in Fall 1853. His fluent English skills gave him a decided advantage over the other refugees from Germany. A prominent New England poet noted "He uses the English language with an idiomatic correctness, power and elegance, unusual even among those born and bred to it." He devoted himself to lecturing. Educated Americans found him an effective speaker who could present German philosophy and historical research and criticism in a compelling way. He also spoke on ethnography and current events, for example the Crimean War.

Solger's lectures were seldom attended by more than 60-100 listeners, but these were usually the most prominent intellectuals of wherever he was speaking. For example, when he spoke in Cambridge, professors from Harvard with their president were among the attendees. He had the rare privilege of giving two courses of lectures for the Lowell Institute: in the 1857-58 season he gave a series of 12 lectures on "History of the Reformation," and in the 1859-60 season he gave a series of 12 lectures on "Rome, Christianity, and the Rise of Modern Civilization." Solger's last public appearance in the lecture pulpit came in early 1861 when he spoke at Theodore Parker's church to Parker's congregation. His lecture contrasted the Revolutionary War uprising with that of Prussia in 1813.

Solger wrote little in the United States. His most significant work was a series of letters he wrote to the New York Independent on the Crimean War in 1855. He adapted his earlier piece, Der Reichstagprofessor, to the United States under the title The Hon. Anodyne Humdrum, or the Union shall and must be preserved. The Bell-Everett man and the Douglas democrat appeared prominently in this piece. Solger thought it could be useful in the presidential campaigns, but theater directors rejected it because it presented blacks and whites together on the stage.

Solger became a United States citizen in 1859. In politics, he joined the ranks of the Republican Party. He was actively involved in the presidential campaigns of 1856 and 1860, speaking in various states. He spoke throughout Indiana for Abraham Lincoln, receiving no reimbursement for his expenses. In Kapp's opinion, he was relatively ineffective in this role though. He was too much the aristocratic lecturer, and had a rather condescending effect. His speeches were too abstract and provided no inspiration to his listeners. However, in a 29 November 1865 letter to Ohio Senator John Sherman, Massachusetts Governor John Albion Andrew praised Solger as being as effective in the East as Carl Schurz was in the West in bringing German immigrants over to the side of the Republican Party.

Solger became known to his fellow German immigrants during the celebrations of Friedrich Schiller's 100th birthday. A New York committee awarded top prize to a poem he wrote for this occasion, "Erinnerung." Also notable were a speech he gave for Boston's Schiller celebration on 10 November 1859, and his 1862 novel Anton in Amerika which the owner of the Belletristisches Journal termed the best novel taken from German-American life.

== New York ==
In the spring of 1861, he moved to New York City, and Friedrich Kapp recalls many interesting discussions on evening walks through Central Park the two friends carried on during this time. At this time, Solger had many plans for significant literary works which however never were realized. His efforts to present the German point of view on the Schleswig-Holstein Question were much appreciated by his fellow immigrants. In 1861 he prepared a memorandum on this subject for the new U.S. ambassador to Denmark, Bradford R. Wood. Several months before he had written two articles for the New York World on "The Sleswick Holstein Question." He spent a year in New York before moving to Washington, D. C., where he had obtained an appointment as assistant registrar in the Treasury Department.

== Washington, D.C. ==
Solger arrived in Washington in the winter of 1862-63. His signature validated millions of dollars of government debt certificates. In the middle of April 1864 he suffered a stroke which left his entire right side paralyzed. His fluency in English and French disappeared, and he was only able to speak simple phrases in German. He undertook rehabilitation in Boston January to June 1865 but this was not helpful. He recovered somewhat, but died after another stroke on 11 January 1866. He was buried in Washington.

== Miscellaneous ==
In a letter to H. G. O. Blake of November 16, 1857, Henry Thoreau reports that "Dr. Solger has been lecturing in the vestry in this town [Concord] on Geography, to Sanborn's scholars, for several months past, at 5 p.m. Emerson and Alcott have been to hear him." Thoreau himself didn't go to Solger's lectures however since he preferred to be outdoors during the daylight hours.

His obituary in the 18 January 1866 Roxbury City Gazette reads "Dr. Reinhold Solger, who resided for a number of years at Roxbury, and delivered several lectures before the Lowell Institute, died recently at Washington. He was a Prussian of democratic tendencies, and having incurred the displeasure of the government, came to the United States. Few among our educated men wrote better English."
