= Wilhelm Loewe =

German politician (1814–1886)

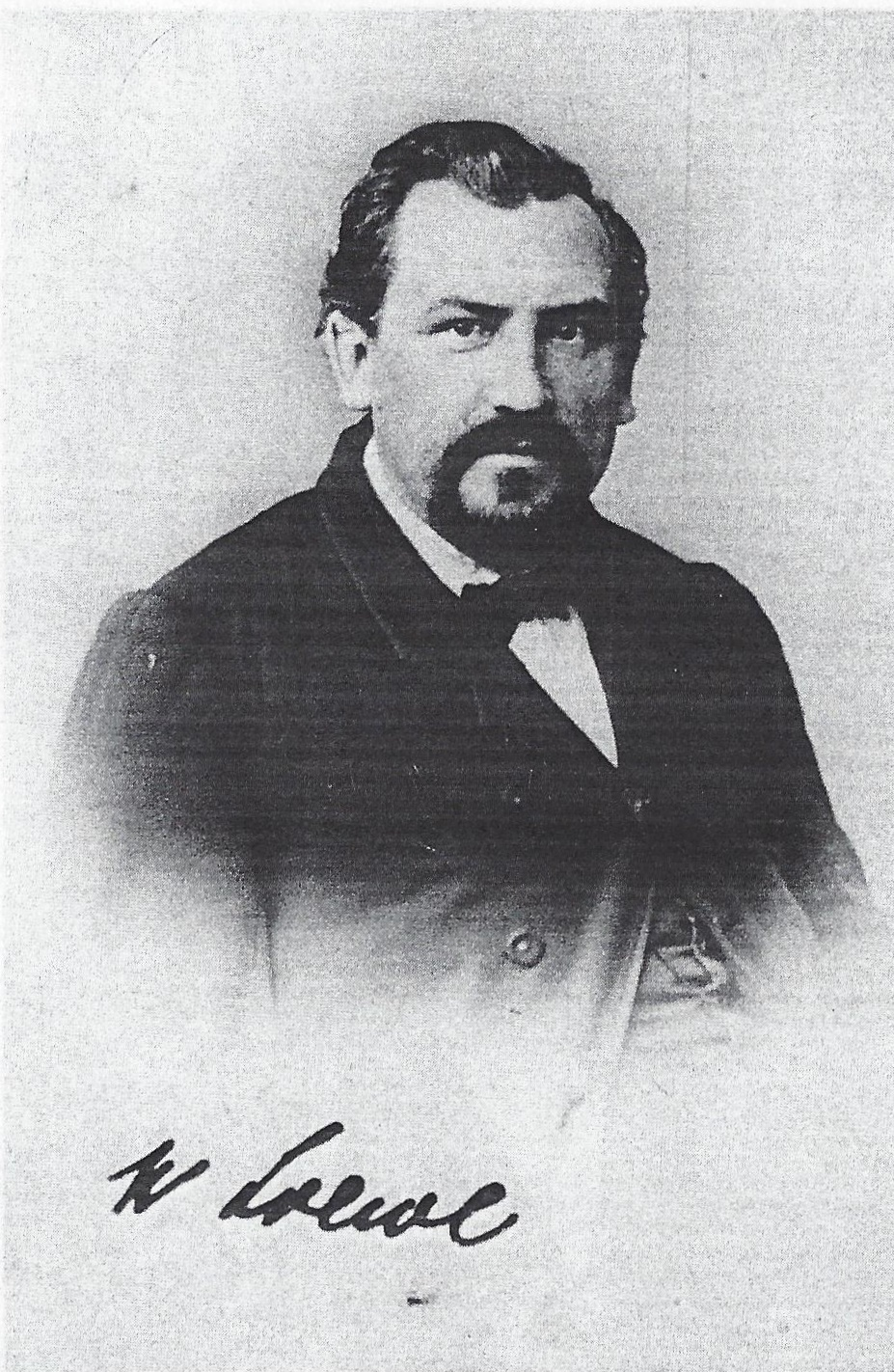
- Loewe in 1868.

Personal details
- Born: 14 November 1814 Magdeburg
- Died: 2 November 1886 (aged 71) Meran, Austria-Hungary

Freidrich Wilhelm Loewe (14 November 1814 – 2 November 1886) was a German physician and Liberal politician, also called Wilhelm Loewe-Kalbe or Wilhelm Loewe von Kalbe. He was president of the "rump parliament" remnant of the Frankfurt Parliament.

== Biography ==
He was educated at the University of Halle and became a practicing physician. In 1848, he was elected to the Frankfurt Parliament, was a prominent member of the extreme Democratic Party, was soon chosen first vice-president of the Parliament. After it moved to Stuttgart, he was made president. At first acquitted on the charge of sedition for his part in this revolutionary movement, he was finally sentenced to life imprisonment for contumacy. He spent several years in Switzerland, Paris, and London, and then practiced medicine for eight years in New York City.

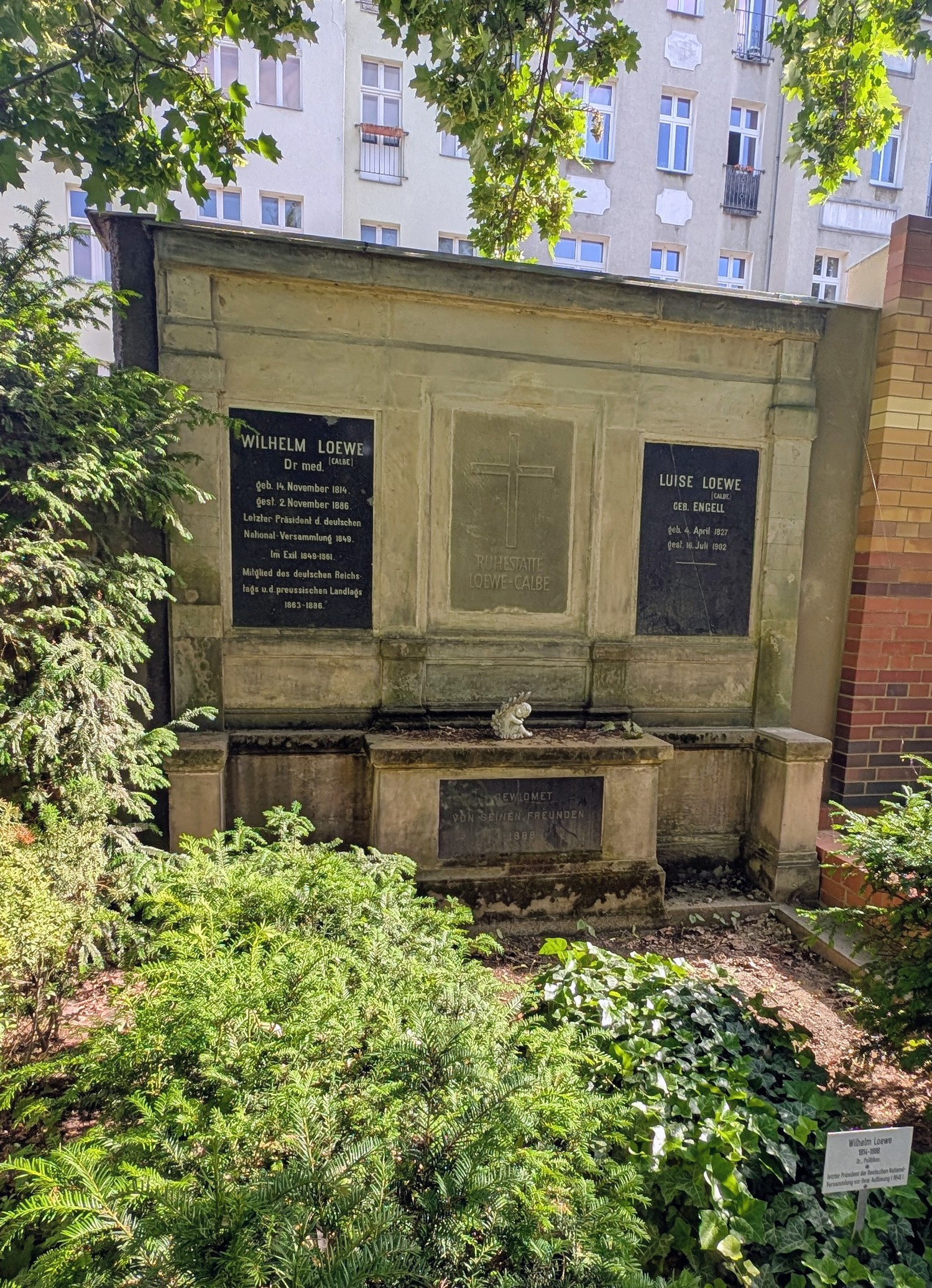
Grave Dr. Wilhelm Loewe, Berlin

In 1861, he benefited by the amnesty and returned to Germany. Two years later he was elected to the Prussian House of Deputies, and in 1867 to the North German Reichstag as a member of the Progressist Party. In 1874, he quarreled with his party on the military law of that year, and tried to form with other independents a Liberal Party which would agree in political matters with the Progressist Party, but would be free on economic questions. In carrying out this policy, he eagerly defended the protective tariff of 1879. He was defeated for reelection in 1881.
