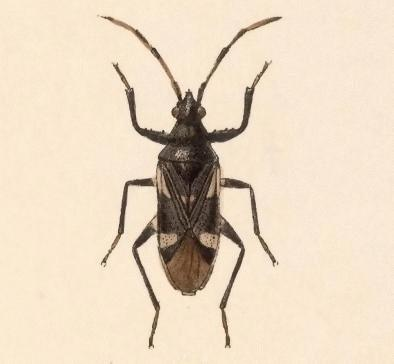
- Bathycles maculatus

Scientific classification
- Kingdom: Animalia
- Phylum: Arthropoda
- Class: Insecta
- Order: Hemiptera
- Suborder: Heteroptera
- Family: Rhyparochromidae
- Subfamily: Rhyparochrominae
- Tribe: Udeocorini

= Udeocorini =

Tribe of true bugs

Udeocorini is a tribe of dirt-colored seed bugs in the family Rhyparochromidae. There are about 17 genera and more than 30 described species in Udeocorini.

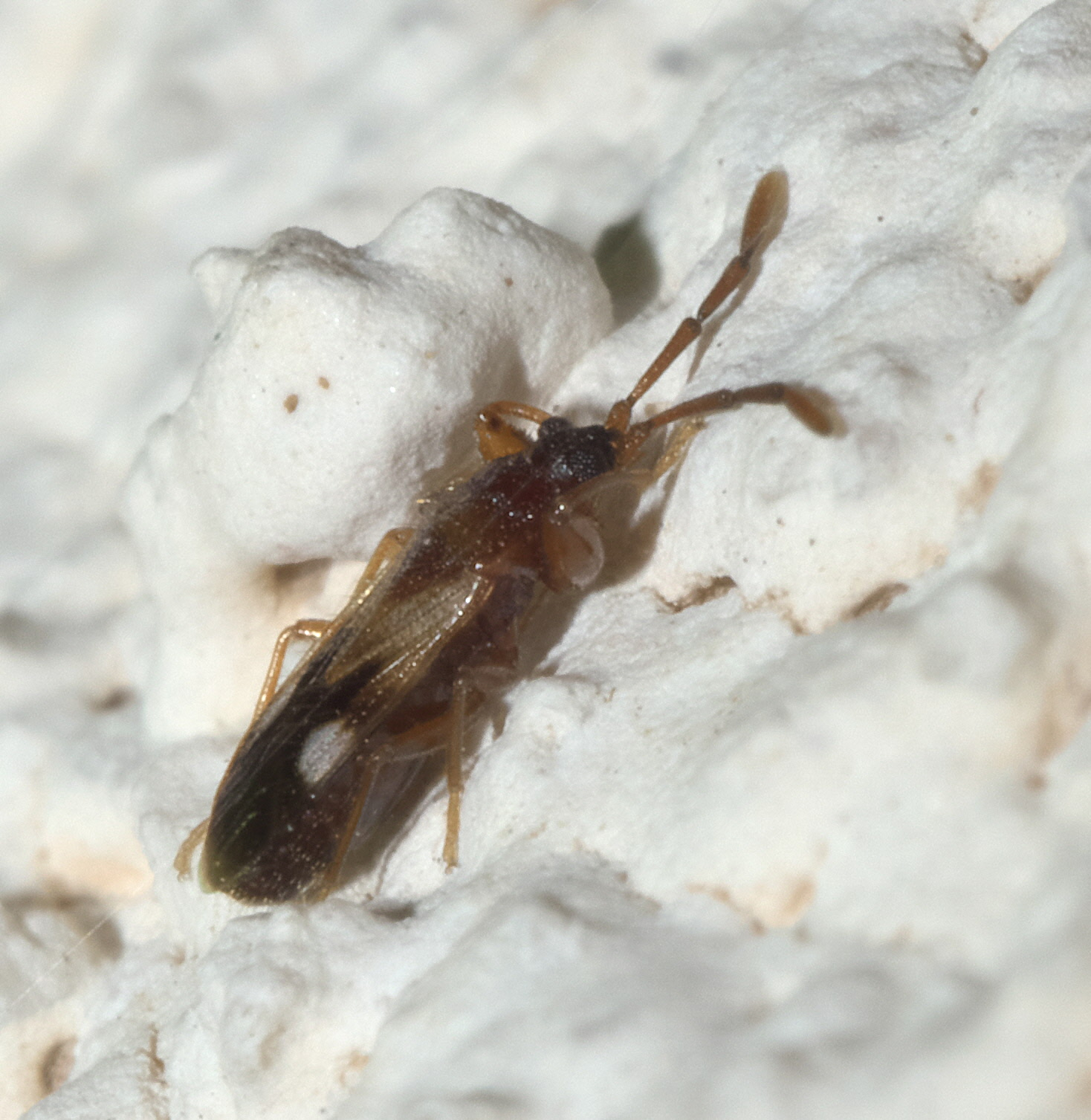
Tempyra biguttula

== Genera ==
These 17 genera belong to the tribe Udeocorini:

- Astemmoplitus Spinola, 1852
- Bathycles Distant, 1893
- Cryptocoris Gross, 1962
- Daerlac Signoret, 1881
- Euander Stal, 1865
- Fontejanus Breddin, 1904
- Fontejus Stal, 1862
- Insulicola Kirkaldy, 1908
- Laryngodus Herrich-Schaeffer, 1850
- Neosuris Barber, 1924
- Porander Gross, 1962
- Serranegra Lindberg, 1958
- Telocoris Gross, 1962
- Tempyra Stal, 1874
- Udeocoris Bergroth, 1918
- Udeopamera Slater, 1978
- Zygocoris Gross, 1962
