= Follen =

Follen is a surname. Notable people with the surname include:

- Charles Follen Adams (1842–1918), American poet
- August Ludwig Follen (1794–1855), German poet
- Charles Follen (1796–1840), German poet and patriot, became the first professor of German at Harvard University, a Unitarian minister, and a radical abolitionist
- Eliza Lee Cabot Follen (1787–1860), author and abolitionist
- Paul Follen (1799–1844), German-American attorney and farmer, who had founded the Gießener Auswanderungsgesellschaft
- Charles Follen McKim (1847–1909), American Beaux-Arts architect of the late 19th century

== See also ==
- Follen Street Historic District, historic district in Cambridge, Massachusetts, just northwest of the Cambridge Common
- Building at 10 Follen Street, historic house at 10 Follen Street in Cambridge, Massachusetts
- Follen Church Society-Unitarian Universalist, historic Unitarian Universalist congregation at 755 Massachusetts Avenue in Lexington, Massachusetts
