= Friedrich Münch =

German-American rationalist, winemaker and author

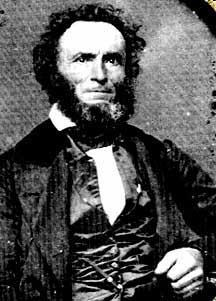
Friedrich Muench (1799-1881)

Friedrich Münch (born June 25, 1799, Niedergemünden, Holy Roman Empire – died in 1881, Dutzow, Missouri) was a German-American rationalist, winemaker, Missouri State Senator, and prolific author for German emigrants, beginning in the 1830s.

== Biography ==
He studied theology at the University of Gießen, Germany, from 1816 to 1819. There he met the brothers Follen (August, Karl and Paul, who founded a democratic and republican student movement, soon to be outlawed. He befriended the youngest brother, Paul Follen, who in 1825 married his sister Maria.

Author Gottfried Duden, a German attorney, settled on the north side of the Missouri River along Lake Creek in 1824. He was investigating the possibilities of settlement in the area by his countrymen. In 1827 he returned to Germany, which he believed was overpopulated. There he first published a glowing Bericht über eine Reise nach den westlichen Staaten Nordamerikas ("A Journey to the Western States of North America") in 1829.

The romantic description of the free life in the United States motivated the Lutheran minister Friedrich Muench and the attorney Paul Follen to found in 1833 the Gießener Auswanderungsgesellschaft ("Gießen Emigration Society"). Both had participated in student movements in Germany. As they felt there was no immediate hope for success, they intended to establish a "new and free German State in the great North American Republic" to serve as a model for a future German republic.

In the spring and summer of 1834 they led 500 German settlers into Missouri. They soon realized that the plan for a separate federal state would remain a utopia. They settled in the German-populated town of Dutzow in Warren County, Missouri, on the north side of the Missouri River, not far from the former farm of Gottfried Duden. This helped attract German immigrants to the area, which along both sides of the river became known as the Missouri Rhineland. The German settlers were known as "Dreißiger", or "Thirtiers", as opposed to the later "Forty Eighters" who migrated after the failed European revolutions of 1848.

Muench was retained by the railroads to write pamphlets urging Germans to settle in the area. They were published in 1859 and 1866. The Bremen Auswander Zeitung called him "Father Muench," the pioneer of German immigration into Missouri.

Muench played a notable role in Missouri politics, where he was a fierce opponent of slavery. He campaigned together with Friedrich Hecker, a former German revolutionist who had immigrated to the US after the failure of the 1848/9 democratic movement in Germany. Muench was elected to Missouri's legislature, where he served during the American Civil War.

Friedrich's brother Georg Muench moved from Lake Creek to Augusta, Missouri, where he purchased his Mount Pleasant farm. Georg's son founded a commercial winery that would eventually become the Mount Pleasant Winery in 1859. Münch was influential in the creation of the Missouri wine industry, which became the second largest in the nation before Prohibition.

Friedrich Münch wrote books on viticulture, theology, and the State of Missouri. He also wrote articles on winemaking, agriculture and emigration to Missouri for the United States and German press, under his pen name Far West.

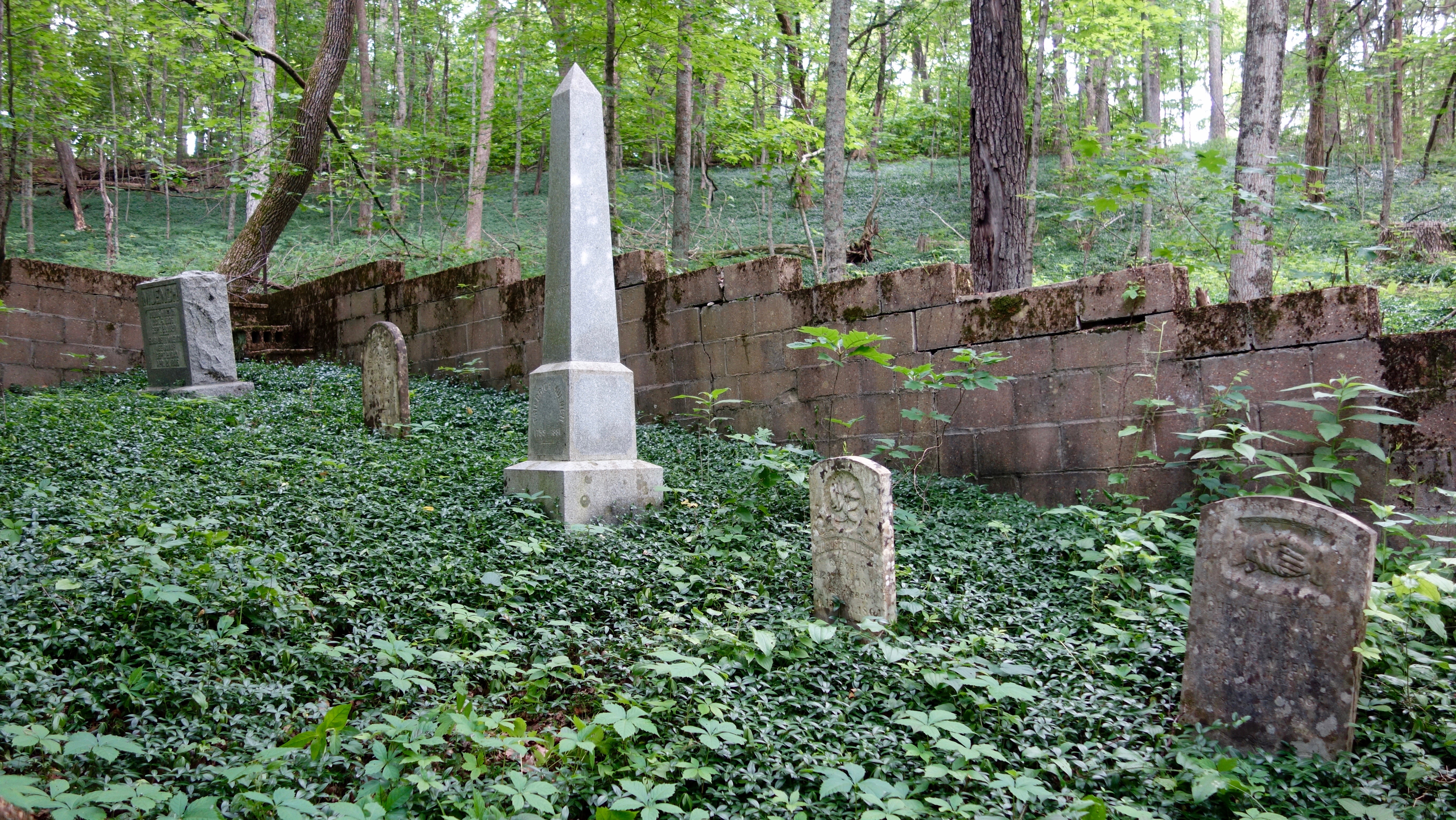
Gravesite of Friedrich Münch and his family in Dutzow, Missouri

On December 14, 1881, Friedrich Münch died on the same farm he first purchased upon arrival in 1834, the only farm he ever lived on and owned in the United States. His children had called him for supper, and discovered him with pruning shears in hand in his vineyard. He is buried with his family, on the same farm, overlooking the Lake Creek valley he loved.

His many descendants were held in high esteem in the St. Louis region. One of his sons was among the first volunteers in the Civil War and died in the Battle of Wilson's Creek under the command of Franz Sigel, a former officer of the German 1848 revolution. One of his daughters, Emilie, married Dr. William Follenius, the son of his old friend Paul Follen.

== Bibliography ==
- Paul Follen und Friedrich Münch: Aufforderung und Erklärung in Betreff einer Auswanderung im Großen aus Teutschland in die nordamerikanischen Freistaaten (Invitation and Declaration Regarding a Mass Emigration from Germany to the North American Free States), Gießen: Ricker, 1833.
- A Treatise on Religion and Christianity, Orthodoxy and Rationalism
- Der Staat Missouri, geschildert mit besonderer Rücksicht auf teutsche Einwanderung (The State of Missouri, Described with Special Regard for the German Immigrant), 1859
- American Grape Culture, 1859
- School for American grape culture: brief but thorough and practical guide to the laying out of vineyards, the treatment of vines, and the production of wine and North America., St. Louis 1865
- Amerikanische Weinbauschule (American Wine School), St. Louis: 1877
- Geisteslehre für die heranreisende Jugend zum Gebrauche für Lehrer höhere Lehranstalten : ein Buch für Lehrer und Schüler und alle Freunde des freien Denkens (Spiritual heranreisende Lesson for the Youth, for the Use of Teachers Colleges: a Book for Teachers and Students and All Friends of Free Thought, St. Louis: 1872
- Friedrich Münch (Hg.): Erinnerungen aus Deutschlands trübster Zeit, dargestellt in den Lebensbildern von Karl Follen, Paul Follen und Friedrich Münch (Memories of Germany's Gloomiest Period, Depicted in the Lives of Karl Follen, Paul Follen and Friedrich Münch), St. Louis (Missouri) and Neustadt: Haardt, 1873.
- Friedrich Münch: Gesammelte Schriften (Collected Works), St. Louis: 1902

== See also ==
- Giessen Emigration Society
- Missouri Rhineland
