= Gießener Auswanderungsgesellschaft =

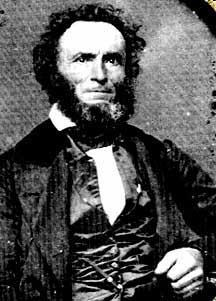
Portrait of Friedrich Münch

The Gießener Auswanderungsgesellschaft (Gießen emigration society) was founded in 1833 in Gießen with the aim of establishing a German-populated federal state within the United States. A majority of the five hundred politically motivated members, from the middle and upper class, settled in Missouri in 1834. The effort was considered a failure, but its leaders did much to contribute to the German influence of the state in the early 19th century.

== History ==
Author Gottfried Duden, a German attorney, settled on the north side of the Missouri River along Lake Creek (now Dutzow, Missouri) in 1824. He was investigating the possibilities of settlement in the area by his countrymen. In 1827 he returned to Germany and in 1829 published Bericht über eine Reise nach den westlichen Staaten Nordamerika's und einen mehrjährigen Aufenthalt am Missouri (in den Jahren 1824, 25, 26 und 1827), in Bezug auf Auswanderung und Ueberbevölkerung, oder: Das Leben im Innern der Vereinigten Staaten und dessen Bedeutung für die häusliche und politische Lage der Europäer ("Report of a journey to the western states of North America") in 1829 which gave romantic and glowing descriptions of the Missouri River valley between St. Louis and Hermann, Missouri. The romantic description of the free life in the US motivated the Protestant minister Friedrich Münch and the attorney Paul Follenius/Paul Follen in 1833 to found the Gießen emigration society. Muench and Follenius had participated in the outlawed student revolutions and political movements in Germany prior to, and in the wake of, the French July Revolution of 1832. As there was no immediate hope for success, they established the Giessen Emigration Society, with their publication "A Call for a Large Emigration" with the intentions to establish a "new and free Germany in the great North American Republic" to serve as model for a future German Republic.

The small publication was circulated privately throughout Germany, secretly passed and discussed. Muench and Follenius's followers grew and became so large, they could not take all that responded on this first call, and closed at 500 members. The Statutes of the Society were lengthy, and the costs were high. Members were required to post dues in advance, have enough funds for all of their travel, their land purchased and the first few years of living. Character references were also required. Members were made up from all areas of Germany, several different religious groups, and many professions, farmers included. Membership dues would cover the costs of travel and settlement for the physicians and teachers, who were granted free membership. The group was to travel in two contingents from Bremen in the spring of 1834. In May 1834, the Olbers, led by Paul Follenius, departed from Bremen, headed for New Orleans, where the group encountered cholera. As they ascended the Mississippi River, now headed for St. Louis, many members grew ill, and some died. At the same time, unbeknown to the first group, the second contingent led by Friedrich Muench was encountering their own difficulties in Bremen, and was delayed several weeks. They arrived in late July 1834 at Baltimore, and began to head quickly for St. Louis. At Cincinnati they met up with Baron von Bock of Dutzow who told them of the first group's arrival and misfortunes.

Both leaders, Friedrich Muench and Paul Follenius, settled on farms next to that of Gottfried Duden near the German-populated Dutzow, Missouri. They soon realized that the plan for a separate German federal state would remain a utopia. Other families settled nearby in southeastern Warren County, and in nearby Franklin and St. Charles counties. Many of these early families would soon begin to write their own letters home, encouraging further emigration. As many were professionals and politically motivated, they were active in their communities' efforts and politics. These families were actively involved in efforts regarding the abolition of slavery during the Civil War, and many created and joined companies of the Union Army that were made up completely of Germans. The influence of these first five hundred can still be found in the area today that follows the Missouri River from St. Louis to Hermann — often called Little Germany, Missouri. This area, also called the Missouri Weinstrasse, still retains much of the early German influence in its culture and historic architecture.

== See also ==
- Dreissiger
- Missouri wine
- Mount Pleasant Winery
- Missouri Rhineland
