= Dreissiger =

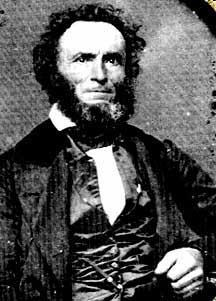
Friedrich Münch (1799-1881), a leading organizer of the Dreissiger

The term Dreissiger (German Dreißiger) (Thirtiers) refers to liberal intellectuals who left Germany and came to the United States in the 1830s to escape political repression. In a broader sense, it refers to immigrants from across Germany, and including members of every social and economic class, who immigrated to the US during this period.

The French July Revolution of 1830, the Hambacher Fest of 1832 and the failure of the Frankfurter Wachensturm of 1833 were followed by restrictions on press freedom and academic freedom. At the instigation of the chancellor of the Austrian Empire, Prince Metternich, the Central Federal Bureau of Investigations (German: Bundeszentralbehörde für Untersuchungen) was set up after the revolt against the reign in the Free City of Frankfurt by the States of the German Confederation dominated through the Austrian monarchy.

Leaders including Paul Follenius and Friedrich Münch organized the Giessen Emigration Society to help Germans move to a "new and free Germany in the great North American Republic." The Dreissiger were generally more cautious than the later forty-eighters, who immigrated to the US after the failed European revolutions of 1848. The more liberal of the Dreissiger formed societies dedicated to supporting equality and justice, but the more conservative Catholic Germans were uncomfortable with this activism.

== Notable German Dreissiger in the US ==
- Paul Follen (1799–1844), attorney and farmer, founder of the Giessen Emigration Society (German: Gießener Auswanderungsgesellschaft)
- Friedrich Münch (1799-1881), pastor, vintner, politician and author
- Gustav Bunsen (1804–1836), surgeon, leader of the Frankfurter Wachensturm, killed in action in the Texas War of Independence
- Theodor Engelmann (1808–1889), lawyer, journalist and newspaper publisher
- Gustav Koerner (1809–1896), attorney and judge, Brig. General, diplomat and statesman, journalist
- Ferdinand Lindheimer (1801–1879), botanist (Father of Texas Botany), journalist and newspaper publisher
