= Carl Vogt (disambiguation) =

Carl Vogt (1817–1895) was a German scientist, philosopher and politician.

Carl Vogt may also refer to:

- Carl Henry Vogt or Louis Calhern (1895–1956), American actor
- Carl W. Vogt, president of Williams College

== See also ==
- Carl de Vogt (1885–1970), German film actor
