= Gottfried Duden =

German emigration writer (1789–1856)

Gottfried Duden (May 19, 1789 – October 29, 1856) was a German emigration writer from Remscheid, Rhineland in the early 19th century. His famous book Bericht über eine Reise nach den westlichen Staaten Nordamerikas und einen mehrjährigen Aufenthalt am Missouri in den Jahren 1824 bis 1827 ("Report of a journey to the western states of North America and a multi-year sojourn in the years 1824 through 1827") gave romantic and glowing descriptions of the Missouri River valley between St. Louis and Hermann, Missouri. He established a farm near what is now Dutzow, Missouri along the Missouri River near Washington, Missouri. His book on the region, comparing the Missouri River to the Rhine in Germany, and his positive remarks concerning the climate, culture and soils in Missouri led to tens of thousands of Germans immigrating to the Missouri Rhineland region, beginning in the 1830s.

Gottfried Duden was born in Remscheid, Duchy of Berg. The middle child of Leonhard and Maria (née Hartcop) Duden. He was educated in law, and after serving as a justice for several years decided to investigate the U.S. as a possible place for emigration. Germany was suffering from overpopulation, high crime and famine, and following the Napoleonic Wars there were several emigration books suggesting emigration to Russia, South America and England as well. Duden had studied these, but felt that none that were written on the U.S. had actually been visited by the author.

He purchased land in what was Montgomery County (later Warren County) about 50 miles west of St. Louis. He arrived in Missouri in 1824, with a professional farmer by the name of Ludwig Eversmann and a female cook named Gertrude Obladen. For three years he lived with a nearby farmer named Jacob Haun, while Eversmann married and settled nearby on land they had purchased. He had a house built on his land just south of Haun and Eversmann. As a researcher he spent his days idyllically visiting the lead mines, duck hunting with Nathan Boone, and observing nature. His letters home covered a myriad of topics from slavery and Indians to farming methods and weather. His time spent in the U.S., 1824-1827 was during a period that experienced mild weather, and he failed to give an accurate depiction of the winters.

He returned to Germany in 1827, and in 1829 he self-published 1500 copies of his "Report" in the form of letters written home with addendums for those wishing to be farmers or businessmen. It praised the virtues of settling in Missouri. Apparently numerous similar books circulated in Germany at that time, but Duden's was especially well known and well received. The result was a flood of German immigrants beginning in the 1830s. Additional editions were published by Duden and other emigration societies.

Duden had advised traveling in groups for safety as Missouri had just become a state eight years prior. The first of such groups was known as the Berlin Society arrived in October 1832, whose founder was a German Baron Johann Wilhelm von Bock, who funded the communal purchase of 500 acres of land on the southern border of Duden's farm. Bock would plat a village that he named Dutzow, Missouri after his former estate in Germany on this land. In 1834, the arrival of the leaders of the Giessen Emigration Society brought several more well-educated and affluent Germans to the area. Co-founder Friedrich Muench settled on the north side of Duden's farm. Muench's property was on the south side of Jacob Haun's, which had been purchased by his brother-in-law and co-founder of the Society Paul Follenius. Follenius was the younger brother of Karl Follen.

By 1840, more than 38,000 Germans had settled in the lower Missouri River valley. German immigrants to Missouri are often called "followers of Duden." Duden never returned to Missouri as he had originally planned. Duden died in 1856, and is buried in Bonn, Germany, still owning his Missouri farm. Charles van Ravanswaay wrote: "This timely work . . . greatly stimulated immigration to the United States and caused thousands to make Missouri their destination . . . For more than a generation Duden's writings formed the leitmotif of German settlement in Missouri, with the interpretation of his comments provoking endless discussion among those who came here. Many immigrants continued to revere his memory as the father of the German migration, and even those who blamed him for their misfortunes seem to have had a grudging respect for that kindly, guileless man."
