= Eliza Lee Cabot Follen =

American writer, editor, and abolitionist

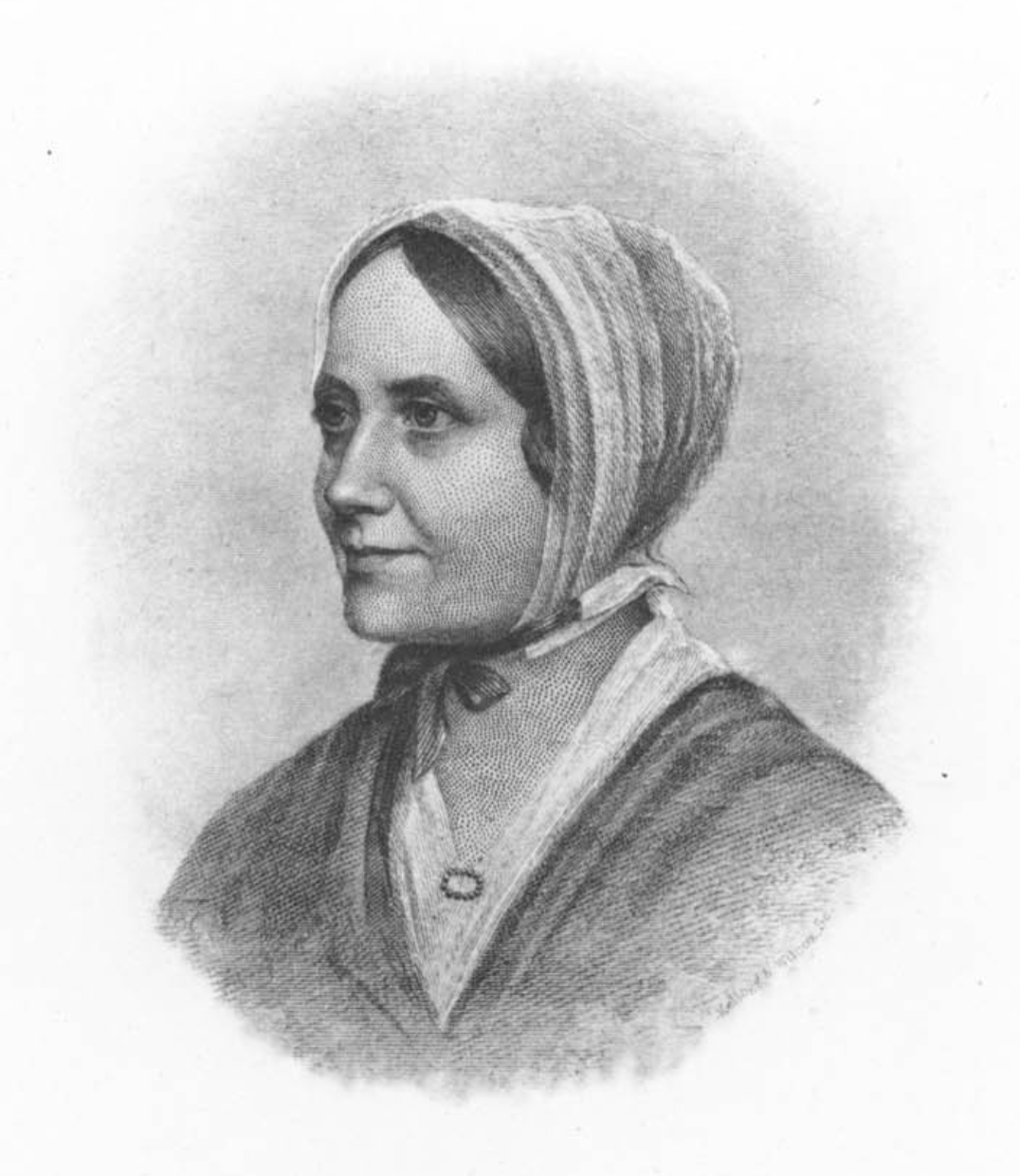
- Born: Eliza Lee Cabot; August 15, 1787; Boston, Massachusetts, U.S.
- Died: January 26, 1860 (aged 72); Brookline, Massachusetts, U.S.
- Occupations: Unitarian writer, editor, abolitionist
- Spouse: Charles Follen (m. 1828; died 1840)
- Children: Charles Christopher Follen (son)
- Relatives: Cabot family
- Writing career
- Language: English

Eliza Lee Cabot Follen (August 15, 1787 – January 26, 1860) was an American writer, editor, and abolitionist. In her early life, she contributed various pieces of prose and poetry to papers and magazines. In 1828, she married Prof. Charles Follen, who died on board the Lexington in 1840. During her married life, she published a variety of popular and useful books, all of which were characterized by her Christian piety. Among the works she gave to the press are, Selections from Fénelon, The Well-spent Hour, Words of Truth, The Sceptic, Married Life, Little Songs, Poems, Life of Charles Follen, Twilight Stories, Second Series of Little Songs, as well as a compilation of Home Dramas, and German Fairy Tales. Holding an interest in the religious instruction of the young, she edited, in 1829, the Christian Teacher's Manual, and, from 1843 to 1850, the Child's Friend. She died in Brookline, Massachusetts in 1860.

== Early years ==
Eliza Lee Cabot was born in Boston, August 15, 1787, the fifth of thirteen children in the prominent Cabot family of that city. She was the daughter of Samuel Cabot, and Sarah Barrett Cabot.

She was well-educated.

== Career ==
When Samuel died in 1819, ten years after her mother had died, Eliza Cabot and her two sisters established a household, and she developed a large circle of friends with literary and religious interests. Her friends included William Ellery Channing and Henry Ware. Within this circle, she co-founded a Sunday school affiliated with the Federal Street Church.

Catharine Sedgwick introduced her to the educator Charles Follen. Nine years her junior, he initially became Eliza Cabot's protégé. In 1828, after his betrothed in Germany declined to emigrate to the United States, Eliza and Charles married. He perished on board the Lexington, which was burnt on Long Island Sound, January 13, 1840.

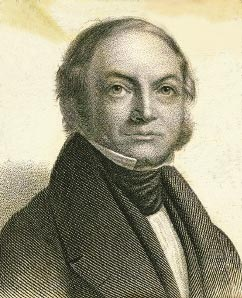
Charles Follen

After Charles's death, Follen educated their only son, Charles Christopher (born 1830), whom, with other pupils, she fitted for Harvard University. An intimate friend of Channing, she was a zealous opponent of slavery.

Follen published the writings of François Fénelon, and of her husband. Her writings also included: Little Songs, for Little Boys and Girls (Boston: Leonard C. Bowles, 1833), The Skeptic (1835), and Sketches of Married Life (1838). She edited two Sunday school publications, the Christian Teacher's Manual (1828–1830) and the Child's Friend (1843–1850).

She was a prolific writer. Her poems were first published at Boston (Crosby & Co.), 1839, and while she was in England, she issued another volume for children's use, entitled The Lark and the Linnet, in 1854. Both volumes also contain some translations from the German, and versions of a few Psalms. Her best known hymns are:

- "How sweet to be allowed to pray". (Resignation.) Appeared in the Christian Disciple, September 1818, and in her Poems, 1839, page 116, in four stanzas of 4 lines, and entitled, "Thy will be done."
- "How sweet upon this sacred day". (Sunday.) In her Poems, 1839, pages 113–114, in six stanzas of 4 lines, and entitled "Sabbath Day." It previously appeared in Sabbath Recreations, 1829.
- "Lord, deliver, Thou canst save". (Prayer for the Slave.) Found in Songs of the Free, 1836; but is not given in her Poems, 1839. In John Greenleaf Adams and Edwin Hubbell Chapin's Hymns for Christian devotion: especially adapted to the Universalist denomination, Boston, 1846, it is Number 802, in five stanzas of 4 lines. In common with Number 2, it has found acceptance outside Unitarian collections.
- "God, Thou art good, each perfumed flower". This is the original of J. H. Gurney's hymn, "Yes, God is good". There is some obscurity about the text. It is found in her Hymns for Children, Boston, 1825, beginning, "God is good, each perfumed flower," and this obvious misprint (which destroys the metre) was usually copied in later books. It is also given with the same first line as an original piece, never before published, and signed "E. L. C." (initials of Mrs. Follen's maiden name), in Emily Taylor's Sabbath Recreations, Wellington, Salop, 1826, page 203. This suggests that it was printed in the American book after the manuscript was posted to England. Follen may have written at first "Yes, God is good," but this cannot now be determined. It begins, "God, Thou art good," in her Poems, 1839, page 119, and in her verses, The Lark and the Linnet, 1854, and in each case is in six stanzas of 4 1ines, with the title, "God is Good."
- "Will God, Who made the air and sea". (A Child's Prayer.) Given in her Poems, 1839, page 164, in seven stanzas of 4 1ines. In Dr. Henry Allon's Children's Worship, 1878, Number 212, it is abbreviated to four stanzas (i.-iv.), and attributed to "H. Bateman" in error.

Follen died at Brookline, Massachusetts, January 26, 1860.

== Selected works ==
- The Well-Spent Hour (Boston, 1827)
- Selections from the writings of Fenelon, with a memoir of his life (1829)
- Hymns, Songs and Fables, for Children (Boston, 1831)
- Little Songs, for Little Boys and Girls (Boston, 1833)
- The Skeptic (1835)
- Sketches of Married Life (1838)
- Poems (1839)
- The Child's friend (a periodical; editor 1843–1850)
- The works of Charles Follen, with a memoir of his life (5 vols., 1846)
- To Mothers in the Free States (1855)
- Anti-Slavery Hymns and Songs (1855)
- Twilight Stories (1858)
- Home Dramas (1859)
