= Frankfurter Wachensturm =

Attempted revolution in Frankfurt, Germany

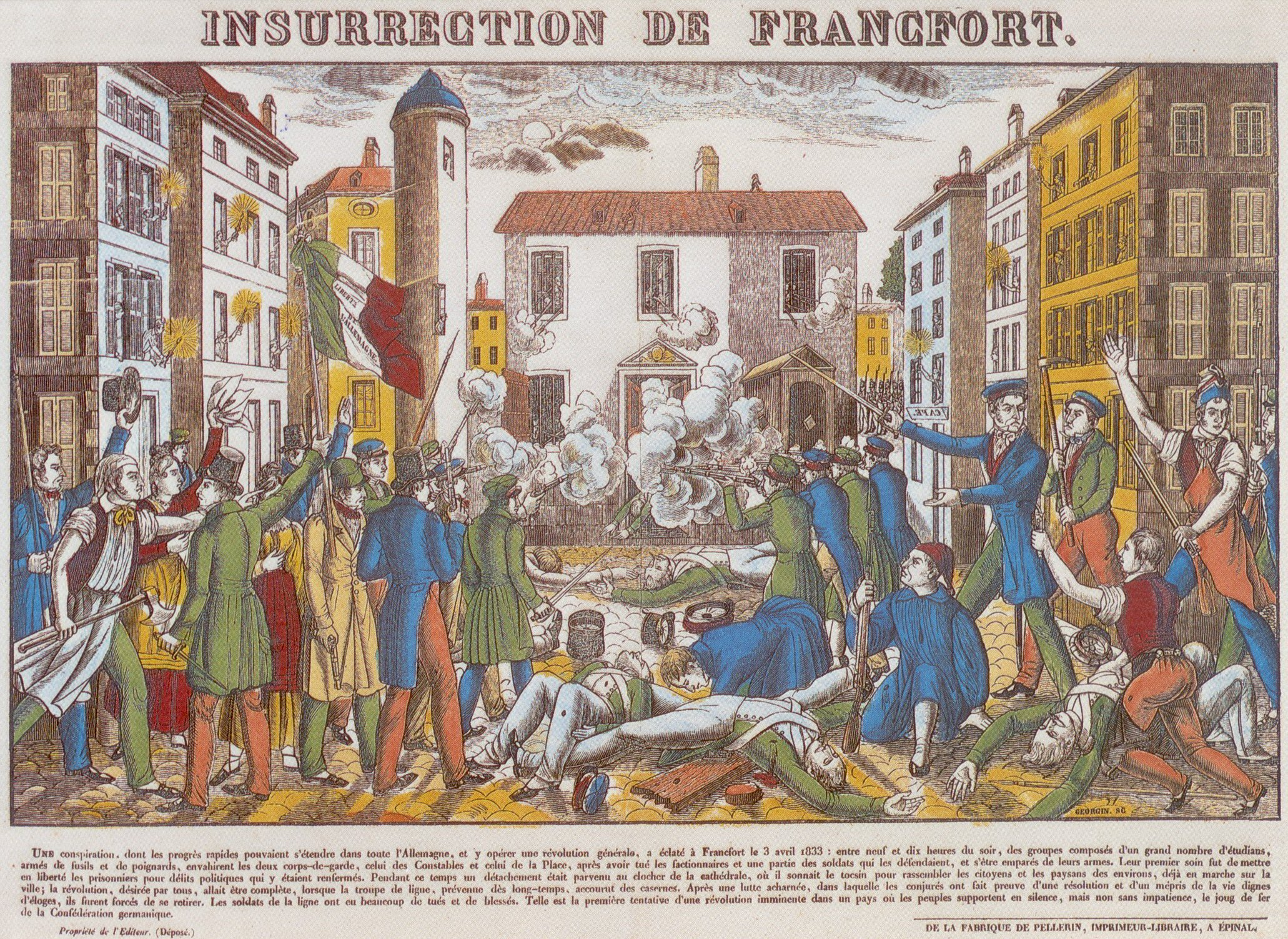
Contemporary illustration of the Wachensturm

The Frankfurter Wachensturm (English: "storming of the Frankfurt police station") on 3 April 1833 was a failed attempt to start a revolution in Germany.

== Events ==
About 50 students attacked the soldiers and policemen of the Frankfurt Police offices Hauptwache and Konstablerwache to try to gain control over the treasury of the German Confederation to start a revolution in all German states. However, because the plot had been betrayed to the police, it was easy to overcome the attackers.

The attack was organized by students, most of them members of the Burschenschaft, Gustav Körner and Gustav Bunsen (de:Gustav Bunsen), a teacher, and others.

== Aftermath ==
After the failed attack, at least eight of those involved, Gustav Körner, George Bunsen, Gustav Bunsen, Henry Abend, Theodore Engleman, Georg Neuhoff, Ferdinand Lindheimer, and Adolph Berchelman fled to Belleville, Illinois. Gustav Körner was later Lieutenant Governor of Illinois. Gustav Bunsen died serving Sam Houston in Texas, George Bunsen became superintendent of schools in St. Clair County, Illinois, and Lindheimer eventually settled in New Braunfels, Texas and started the New Braunfelser Zeitung. He is most known for his discoveries of plant specimens, thus giving him the name “Father of Texas Botany”.

This group of 1830s revolutionaries, called in German the Dreißiger, were predecessors of the "Forty-Eighters", who had to emigrate following the 1848 revolutions.

== Literature ==
=== German ===
- Foerster, Cornelia: Der Preß- und Vaterlandsverein von 1832/33. Sozialstruktur und Organisationsformen der bürgerlichen Bewegung in der Zeit des Hambacher Festes, Trier 1982 (= Trierer historische Forschungen, Bd. 3).
- Gerber, Harry: Der Frankfurter Wachensturm vom 3. April 1833. Neue Beiträge zu seinem Verlauf und seiner behördlichen Untersuchung, in: Paul Wentzcke (Hg.): Quellen und Darstellungen zur Geschichte der Burschenschaft und der deutschen Einheitsbewegung, Bd. 14, Berlin 1934, S. 171–212.
- Heer, Georg: Geschichte der Deutschen Burschenschaft, Bd. 2: Die Demagogenzeit 1820–1833, Heidelberg 1927, 2. Aufl. 1965 (= Quellen und Darstellungen zur Geschichte der Burschenschaft und der deutschen Einheitsbewegung, Bd. 10), S. 291–302.
- Jakob, Josef: Die Studentenverbindungen und ihr Verhältnis zu Staat und Gesellschaft an der Ludwig-Maximilians-Universität Landshut/München von 1800 bis 1833, Diss. phil. Fernuniversität Hagen 2002, S. 179–181, 206–209, 211–217.
- Kaupp, Peter: „Bezüglich revolutionärer Umtriebe“. Burschenschafter im „Schwarzen Buch“ (1838). Ein Beitrag zur Sozialstruktur und zur Personengeschichte des deutschen Frühliberalismus, in: Horst Bernhardi, Ernst Wilhelm Wreden (Hg.): Jahresgabe der Gesellschaft für burschenschaftliche Geschichtsforschung 1980/81/82, o. O. (Bad Nauheim) 1981, S. 73–99.
- Kopf, Sabine: Studenten im deutschen Press- und Vaterlandsverein – Zum Verhältnis von Burschenschaften und nichtstudentischer bürgerlicher Opposition 1832/33, in: Helmut Asmus (Hg.): Studentische Burschenschaften und bürgerliche Umwälzung. Zum 175. Jahrestag des Wartburgfestes, Berlin 1992, S. 185–196.
- Leininger, Franz, Herman Haupt: Zur Geschichte des Frankfurter Attentats, in: Herman Haupt (Hg.): Quellen und Darstellungen zur Geschichte der Burschenschaft und der deutschen Einheitsbewegung, Bd. 5, Heidelberg 1920, S. 133–148.
- Lönnecker, Harald: „Unzufriedenheit mit den bestehenden Regierungen unter dem Volke zu verbreiten“. Politische Lieder der Burschenschaften aus der Zeit zwischen 1820 und 1850, in: Max Matter, Nils Grosch (Hg.): Lied und populäre Kultur. Song and Popular Culture, Münster, New York, München, Berlin 2004 (= Jahrbuch des Deutschen Volksliedarchivs Freiburg i. Br., Bd. 48/2003), S. 85–131.
- Polster, Georg: Politische Studentenbewegung und bürgerliche Gesellschaft. Die Würzburger Burschenschaft im Kräftefeld von Staat, Universität und Stadt 1814–1850, Heidelberg 1989 (= Darstellungen und Quellen zur Geschichte der deutschen Einheitsbewegung im neunzehnten und zwanzigsten Jahrhundert, Bd. 13), S. 192 f., 198–203, 207–214, 229 f., 247–259.
- Roeseling, Severin: Burschenehre und Bürgerrecht. Die Geschichte der Heidelberger Burschenschaft von 1824 bis 1834, Heidelberg 1999 (= Heidelberger Abhandlungen zur mittleren und neueren Geschichte, Bd. 12), S. 150–235, 244–289, 296–312, 315–321, 324–329.

=== English ===
- Rudolph L. Biesele, The History of the German Settlements in Texas, 1831–1861 (Austin: Von Boeckmann-Jones, 1930; rpt. 1964).
- William Goetzmann, ed., The American Hegelians: An Intellectual Episode in the History of Western America (New York: Knopf, 1973).
- Minetta Altgelt Goyne, A Life among the Texas Flora: Ferdinand Lindheimer's Letters to George Engelmann (College Station: Texas A&M University Press, 1991).
- Glen E. Lich and Dona B. Reeves, eds., German Culture in Texas (Boston: Twayne, 1980).
- Carl Wittke, Refugees of Revolution: The German Forty-Eighters in America (Philadelphia: University of Pennsylvania Press, 1952).
