= Paul Follen =

German-American attorney and farmer

- Born: 5 May 1799; Gießen, Hesse-Darmstadt, Holy Roman Empire
- Died: 3 October 1844 (aged 45); Dutzow, Missouri, United States
- Occupations: Attorney, Farmer

Paul Follenius (May 5, 1799 – October 3, 1844) was a German-American attorney and farmer, who had founded the Gießener Auswanderungsgesellschaft (Gießen Emigration Society).

== Early life ==
He was born at Gießen, in Hesse-Darmstadt, Germany, to Christoph Follenius (1759-1833) and Rosine Follenius (1766–1799). His father was a counselor-at-law and judge. He was the brother of August Ludwig Follen and Charles Follen, and the uncle of the biologist Carl Vogt. During his studies at the University of Gießen he became friends with Friedrich Muench and in 1825 married Muench's sister Maria.

== Gottfried Duden ==
Philanthropist Gottfried Duden, a German attorney, settled on the north side of the Missouri River along Lake Creek in 1824. He was investigating the possibilities of settlement in the area by his countrymen. In 1827 he returned to Germany, which he felt was overpopulated. There he published Bericht über eine Reise nach den westlichen Staaten Nordamerika's ("Report of a Journey to the Western states of North America") in 1829.

== Friedrick Münch ==
The description of the free life in the US, by Duden, motivated the Protestant minister Friedrich Münch and Follenius to found the Gießener Auswanderungsgesellschaft in 1832. Both had participated in the outlawed republican and democratic movements in Germany in the wake of the French July Revolution of 1832. As there was no immediate hope for success, they intended to establish a "new and free Germany in the great North American Republic" to serve as model for a future German republic.

The Giessen Society was stillborn on its arrival in the United States in 1834. Follenius and Muench dissolved the society upon their meeting in St. Louis. They never intended to create any sort of "utopia" in America. They intended to fully participate in democracy as constituted in the United States. It was, after all, where THE experiment in enlightened government was playing out, and they wanted to be part of it. Follenius and Muench were merely searching for freedom. They planned to be bilingual from the start, which shows that they did not expect to be situated apart from the rest of U.S. society. Muench would eventually serve as a state senator in Missouri during the Civil War, and his brother, Georg, would turn down nomination to the state legislature for health reasons.

Paul Follenius died of disease 10 years after emigrating to the United States.

== German settlers ==
In 1834 they led 500 German settlers into Missouri. They soon realized that their plan for a separate federal state was untenable. They settled in the German populated Dutzow in Warren County, Missouri not far from the former farm of Gottfried Duden.

Follenius died in Dutzow. His son Dr. William Follenius (1829–1902) married Emilie, a daughter of his friend, Friedrich Muench. His brother Karl had emigrated to the US already in 1824.
