= Follen Church Society-Unitarian Universalist =

Historic church in Massachusetts, United States

- Follen Community Church
- U.S. National Register of Historic Places
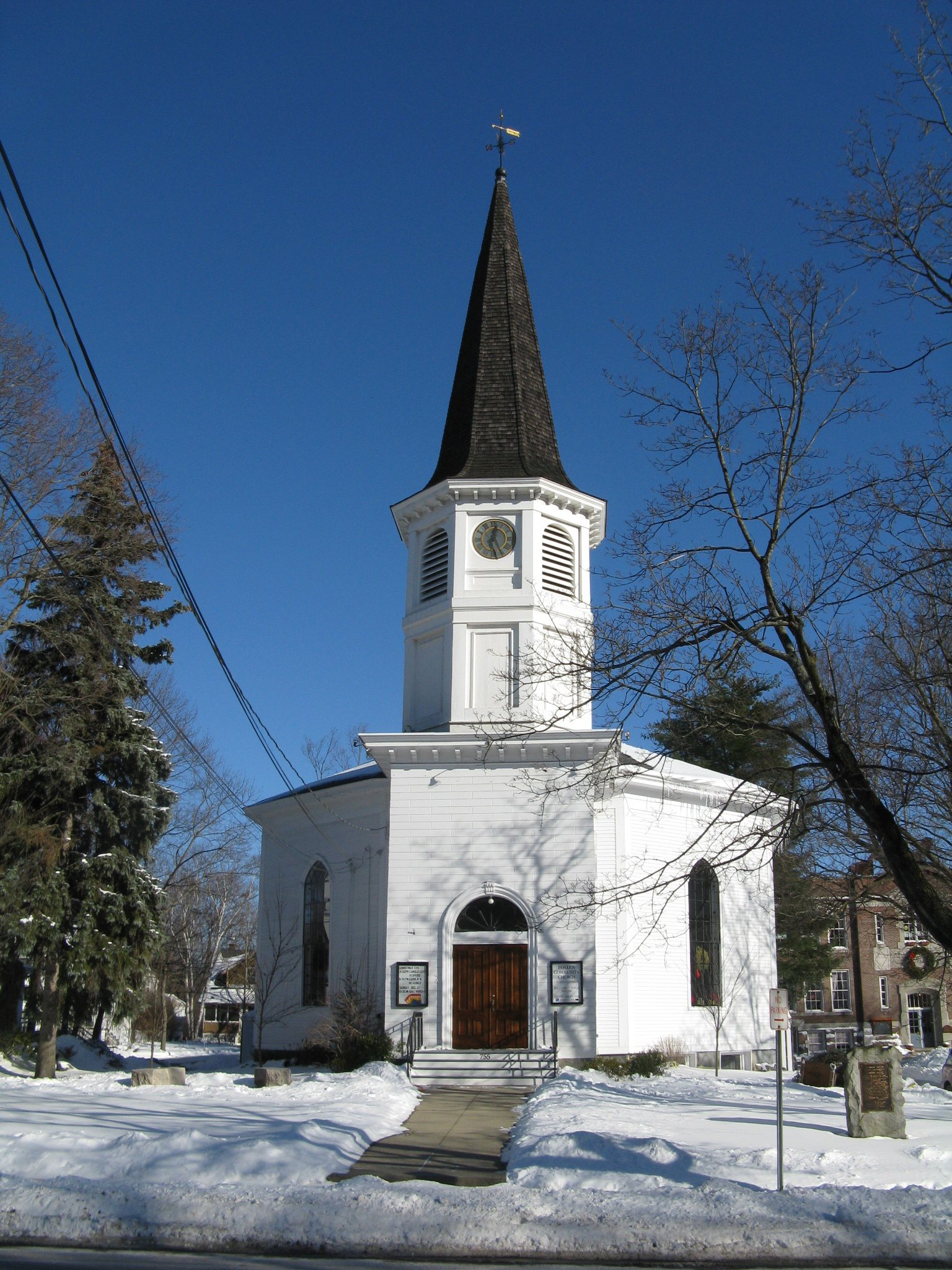

- Location within Massachusetts Location within the United States
- Location: Lexington, Massachusetts
- Coordinates: 42°25′47″N 71°12′27″W
- Built: 1841
- Architect: Rev. Charles Follen
- NRHP reference No.: 76000242
- Added to NRHP: April 30, 1976

Follen Church is a historic Unitarian Universalist congregation located at 755 Massachusetts Avenue in Lexington, Massachusetts, United States.

== History ==
The church is named for Charles Follen who was the first minister called by the church, in 1835. Follen served the congregation from 1835 to 1836 and from 1839 to 1840. Ralph Waldo Emerson was the minister of the congregation, then called the Christian Association of East Lexington, from 1836 to 1838. This was his last ministerial position.

Follen Church, built in 1839, is the oldest standing church building in Lexington. The unique octagonal sanctuary was designed by its first minister, Rev. Follen however he never preached in the sanctuary. He died en route to the dedication ceremony in a wreck at sea. It was named in his honor in 1885.

On April 30, 1976, the church was added to the National Register of Historic Places as the Follen Community Church.

As of August 2013, Rev. Claire Feingold Thoryn has joined Follen as the church's settled minister. Beryl Aschenberg is the Director of Religious Education. Chris Eastburn is the Director of Music.

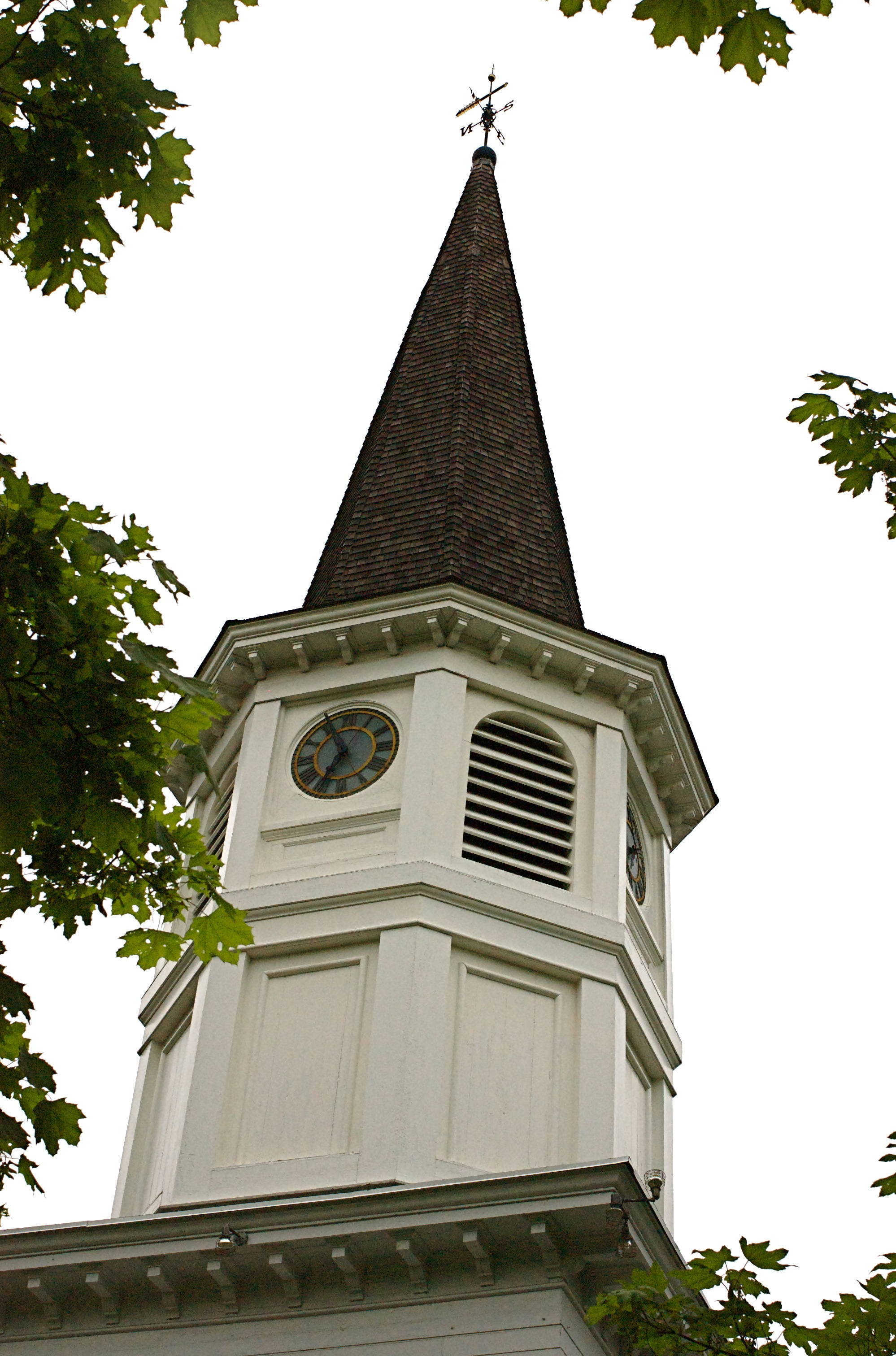
Church steeple

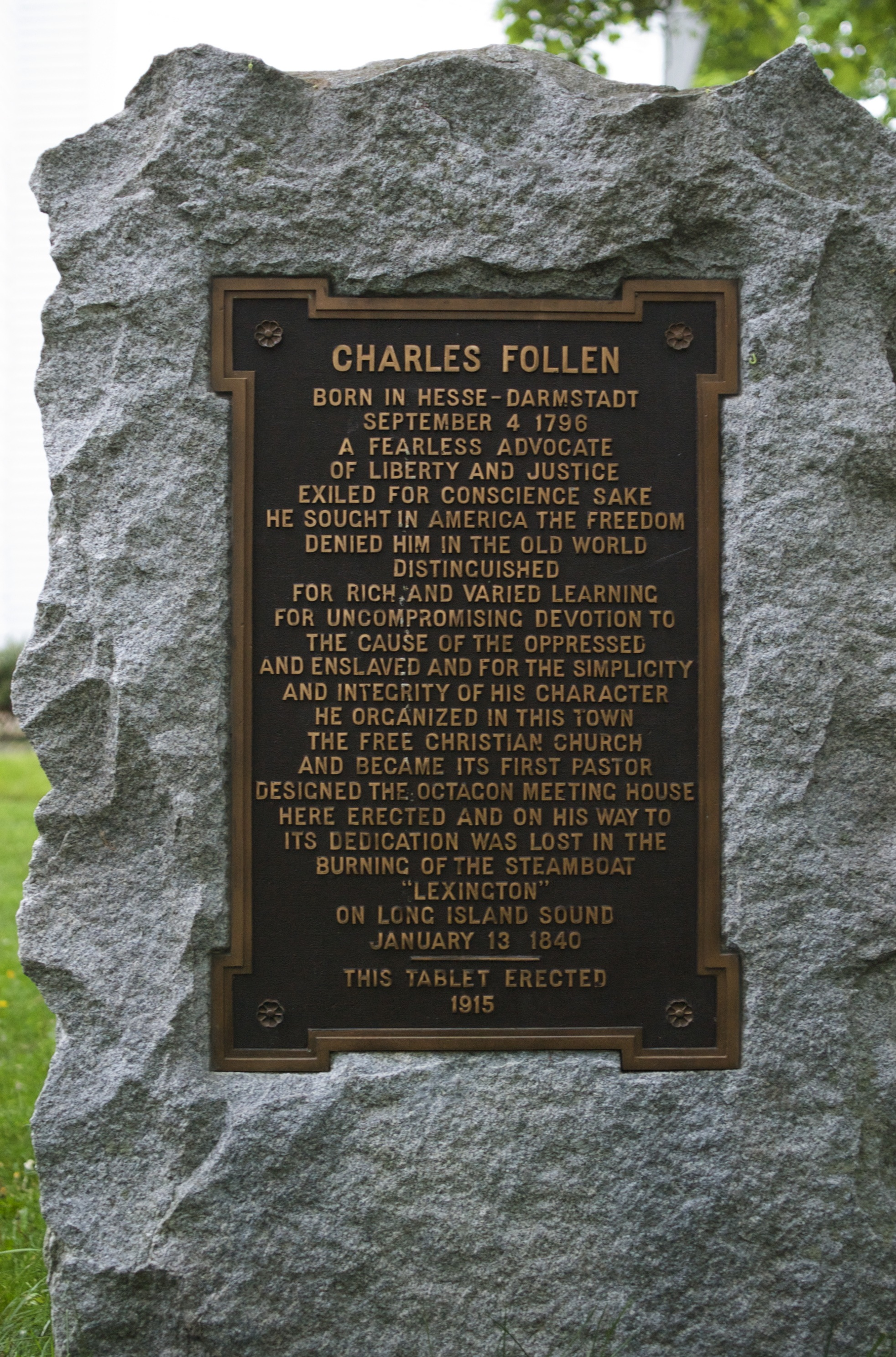
Memorial to Charles Follen in the churchyard

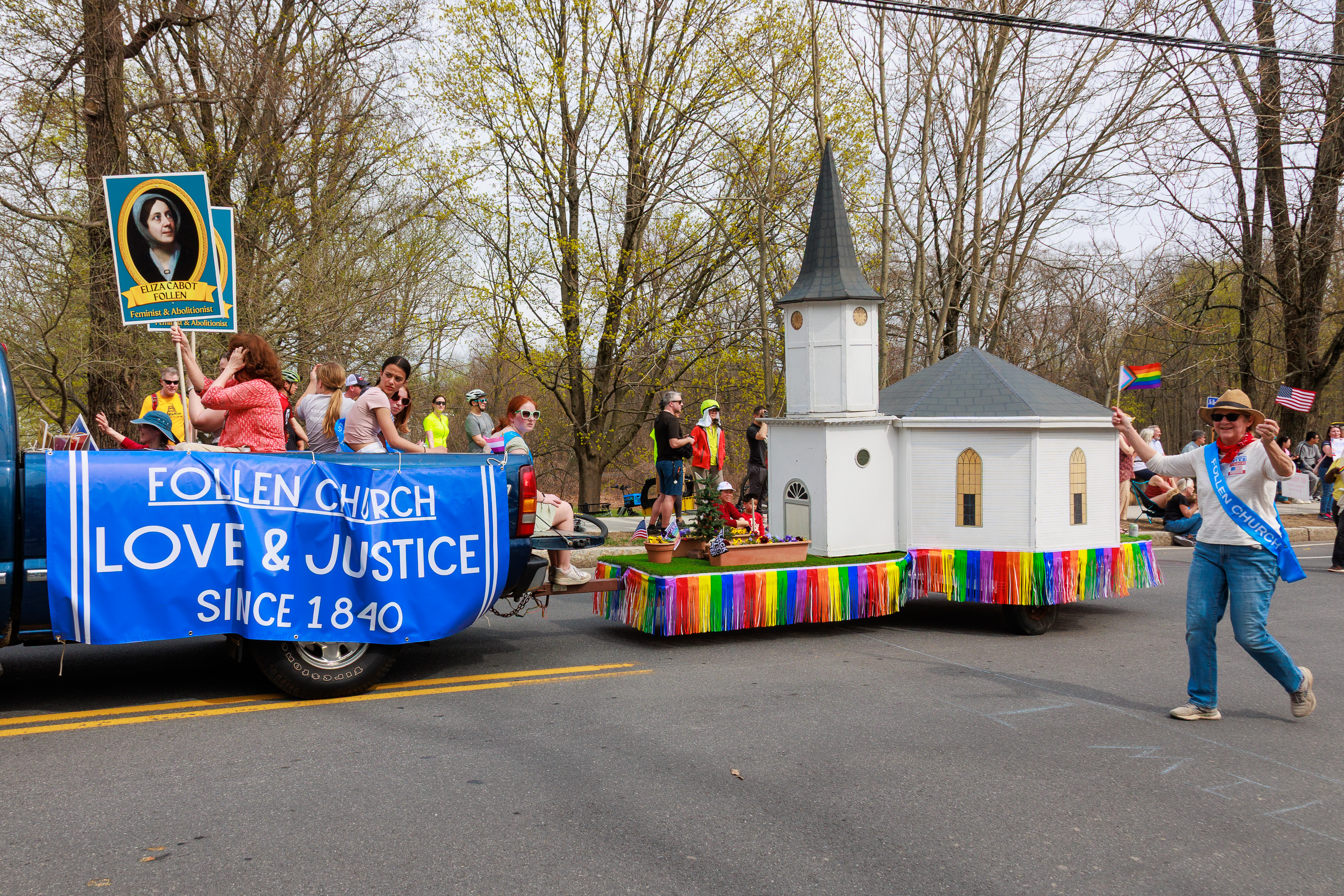
Follen Church parade float

== See also ==
- National Register of Historic Places listings in Middlesex County, Massachusetts
