= Lexington (steamship) =

American paddlewheel steamboat (1835–1840)

Coordinates: 41°1′56″N 73°7′21″W

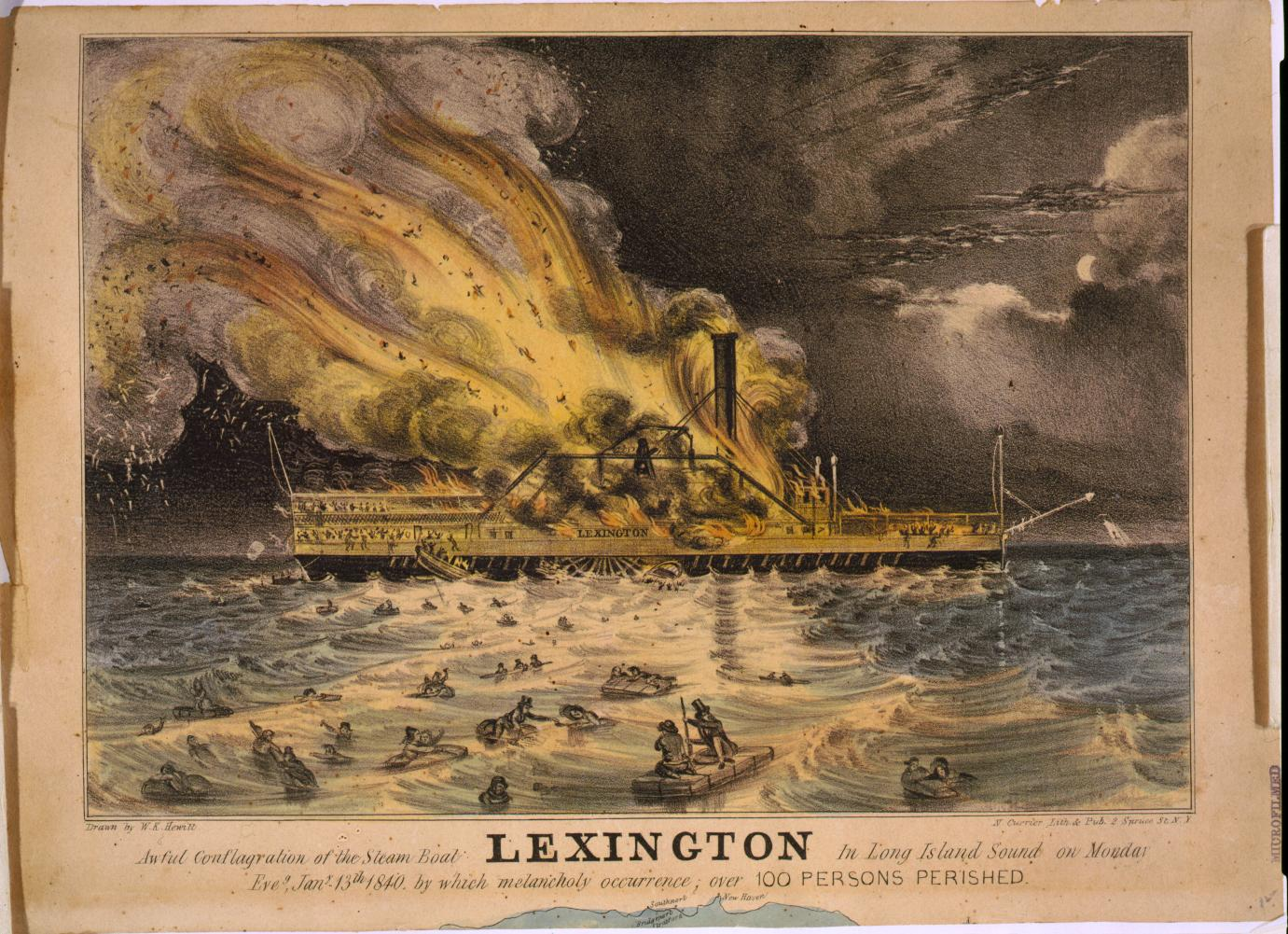
A lithograph of the fire on board the Lexington, by Nathaniel Currier.

The Lexington was a paddlewheel steamboat operating along the Northeastern coast of the United States from 1835 to 1840. Commissioned by Cornelius Vanderbilt, it was one of the fastest and most luxurious steamers in operation.

On 13 January 1840, en route from New York City to Boston, the casing around the ship's smokestack caught fire, igniting nearly 150 bales of cotton and causing the passengers and crew to attempt to abandon ship. Of the estimated 143 people on board, only four survived. The fire had been caused by overheating, due to faulty work on converting the engine for coal-burning. This was compounded by serious errors by the crew, including violation of safety regulations, and the failure of a nearby vessel to come to the aid of the survivors.

== Specifications and route ==
The Lexington was commissioned by Cornelius Vanderbilt in early 1834. The ship's keel was laid down at the Bishop and Simonson Shipyards in New York in September 1834. Unlike later steamboats, no detailed plans of the ship were made. Instead, a wooden model of the hull was carved and altered according to Vanderbilt's satisfaction. Using the model as a guide, full-sized outlines were then drawn in chalk on the timber to be used for the hull, which was then cut and assembled by carpenters. The engine of the Lexington was constructed at the West Point Foundry. Making use of a "walking beam" connection mechanism, activated by a 48-inch-diameter (1.2 m) steam cylinder with an 11-foot (3.4 m) stroke, the ship's engine was one of the most efficient of its time. Measuring 207 feet (63 m) in length and weighing 488 long tons (496 t), the Lexington was also one of the most luxuriously outfitted steamers on its route, incorporating ornate teak deck railings, cabin doors, staircases, and panelling; a large cabin including both a lounge and a dining saloon; and elegant deck lighting, curtains, and furniture.

The Lexington began service as a day boat between New York City and Providence, Rhode Island in 1835. The ship began service to Stonington, Connecticut, the terminus of the newly built railroad from Boston, in 1837. She was sold to the New Jersey Steamship Navigation and Transportation Company in December 1838 for around US$60,000. From 1835 to 1840, the Lexington was the fastest vessel en route from New York City to Boston.

== Fire and wreck ==
The Lexington left its pier on Manhattan's East River at 4:00 p.m. on January 13, 1840, bound for Stonington, Connecticut, the terminus of the newly built railroad from Boston. She was carrying 143 passengers and crew and a cargo of 150 bales of cotton. The ship was expected to arrive in Stonington the following morning in time to meet the train that connected with Boston.

The ship's usual captain, Jacob Vanderbilt (the brother of Cornelius), could not make the voyage owing to illness, and was replaced by veteran Captain George Child.

At 7:30 p.m., the ship's first mate noticed that the woodwork and casings about the smokestack were on fire. The ship was four miles off Eaton's Neck on the north shore of Long Island. Crew members used buckets and boxes to throw water on the flames, as well as a small, hand-pumped fire engine. Once it was apparent that the fire could not be extinguished, the ship's three lifeboats were prepared for launch. The ship's paddlewheel was still churning at full speed, since crewmen could not reach the engine room to shut off the boilers. The first boat was sucked into the wheel, killing its occupants. Captain Child had fallen into the lifeboat and was among those killed. The ropes used to lower the other two boats were cut incorrectly, causing the boats to hit the water stern-first. Both boats promptly sank.

Pilot Stephen Manchester turned the ship toward the shore in hopes of beaching it. The drive-rope that controlled the rudder quickly burned through, and the engine stopped two miles from shore. The ship, out of control, drifted northeast, away from land.

The ship's cargo of cotton ignited quickly, causing the fire to spread from the smokestack to the entire superstructure. Passengers and crew threw empty baggage containers and bales of cotton into the water to be used as rafts. The center of the main deck collapsed shortly after 8:00 p.m.

The fire spread to such an extent that most of the passengers and crew were forced to jump into the frigid water by midnight. Those who had nothing to climb onto quickly succumbed to hypothermia. The ship was still burning when it sank at 3:00 a.m.

According to legend, poet Henry Wadsworth Longfellow was scheduled to travel on the Lexington's fatal voyage, but missed it due to discussing the merits of a recent poem, The Wreck of the Hesperus, with a publisher. The poem also included a ship sinking.

One of the passengers who was lost in the catastrophe was the noted radical minister and abolitionist Karl Follen (1796–1840).

The disaster was depicted in a celebrated colored lithograph by Currier and Ives, and was their first major-selling print. A black-and-white lithograph was also produced from an eyewitness account.

== Survivors ==
Of the 143 people on board the Lexington, only four survived:

Chester Hilliard, 24, the only passenger to survive, had helped crew members throw bales of cotton to people in the water. He climbed onto the last bale at 8:00 p.m., along with ship's fireman Benjamin Cox. About eight hours later, Cox, weak from hypothermia, fell off the bale and drowned. At 11:00 a.m., Hilliard was rescued by the sloop Merchant.

Stephen Manchester, the ship's pilot. He and about 30 others huddled at the bow of the ship until about midnight, when the flames closed in on them. Shortly after he stepped onto a makeshift raft with several passengers, the raft sank. He then climbed onto a bale of cotton with a passenger named Peter McKenna. Three hours later, McKenna died of exposure. Manchester was rescued by the sloop Merchant at noon.

Charles Smith, one of the ship's firemen, descended the stern of the ship and clung to the ship's rudder along with four other people. The five dove into the sea just before the ship sank, around 3:00 a.m., and climbed onto a floating piece of the paddlewheel. The other four men died of exposure during the night, and Smith was rescued by the sloop Merchant at 2:00 the following afternoon.

David Crowley, the second mate, drifted for 43 hours on a bale of cotton, coming ashore 50 miles east, at Baiting Hollow, Long Island. Weak, dehydrated and suffering from exposure, he staggered a mile to the house of Matthias and Mary Hutchinson, and collapsed after knocking on the door. A doctor was immediately summoned, and once well enough, Crowley was taken to Riverhead, where he recovered.

== Inquest ==
An inquest jury found a fatal flaw in the ship's design to be the primary cause of the fire. The ship's boilers were originally built to burn wood, but were converted to burn coal in 1839. This conversion had not been properly completed. Not only did coal burn hotter than wood, but extra coal was being burned on the night of the fire because of rough seas. A spark from the over-heated smokestack set the stack's casing ablaze on the freight deck. The fire then spread to the bales of cotton, which were stored improperly close to the stack.

Previous, smaller fires that had occurred due to the design flaw had been extinguished; however, nothing had been done to correct the problem.

The jury also found crewmen's mistakes and violation of safety regulations to be at fault. Hilliard testified that once crew members noticed the fire, they went below deck to check the engines before attempting to fight the blaze. The jury believed that the fire could have been extinguished if the crew had acted immediately. Also, not all of the ship's fire buckets could be found during the fire. Only about 20 of the passengers were able to locate life preservers. The crew members were also careless in launching the lifeboats, all of which sank.

The sloop Improvement, which had been less than five miles from the burning ship, never came to the Lexington's aid. Captain William Tirrell of the Improvement explained that he was running on a schedule; he did not attempt a rescue because he didn’t want to miss the high tide. The public became furious at this excuse, and Tirrell was attacked by the press in the days following the disaster.

Ultimately, no legislation was passed by the U.S. government in the wake of the tragedy, though critic John Neal issued a call for better construction and operation practices in the New York Evening Signal. It was not until the steamboat Henry Clay burned on the Hudson River 12 years later that new safety regulations were imposed.

The Lexington fire remains Long Island Sound's worst steamboat disaster. One hundred thirty-nine of the 143 aboard perished.

== Salvage attempts ==
An attempt was made to raise the Lexington in 1842. The ship was brought to the surface briefly, and a 30-pound (14 kg) mass of melted silver was recovered from the hull. The chains supporting the hull snapped, and the ship broke apart and sank back to the bottom of Long Island Sound.

Today, the Lexington sits in 140 feet of water, broken into three sections. There is allegedly still gold and silver that has not been recovered. Adolphus S. Harnden of the Boston and New York Express Package Car Office had reportedly been carrying $18,000 in gold and silver coins and $80,000 in paper money at the time of the sinking. The silver recovered in 1842 would have accounted for about $500 of the reported loss.
