= August Ludwig Follen =

German poet (1794–1855)

August (or, as he afterwards called himself, Adolf) Ludwig Follen (21 January 1794 – 26 December 1855) was a German poet.

== Biography ==
He was born at Gießen, in Hesse-Darmstadt, Germany, to Christoph Follen (1759-1833) and Rosine Follen (1766-1799). His father was a counselor-at-law and judge.

In 1814 he and his brother, Charles Follen, fought in the Napoleonic Wars as Hessian volunteers. Before joining the volunteers, he had studied theology and philology at the University of Giessen. On his return, he studied law at University of Heidelberg for two years, and after leaving the university in 1817 edited the Elberfeld Allgemeine Zeitung. Suspected of political agitation and connection with some radical plots, in 1819 he was imprisoned for two years in Berlin.

When released in 1821, he went to Switzerland, where he later became a citizen of Zurich. He taught in the canton school at Aarau, farmed from 1847 to 1854 the estate of Liebenfels in Thurgau, and then retired to Bern, where he lived until his death.

== Works ==
Besides a number of minor poems, he wrote Harfengrüsse aus Deutschland und der Schweiz (1823) and Malegys und Vivian (1829), a knightly romance after the fashion of the romantic school. Of his many translations, mention may be made of the Homeric Hymns in collaboration with R. Schwenck (1814), Tasso's Jerusalem Delivered (1818) and Siegfrieds Tod from the Nibelungenlied (1842); he also collected and translated Latin hymns and sacred poetry (1819).

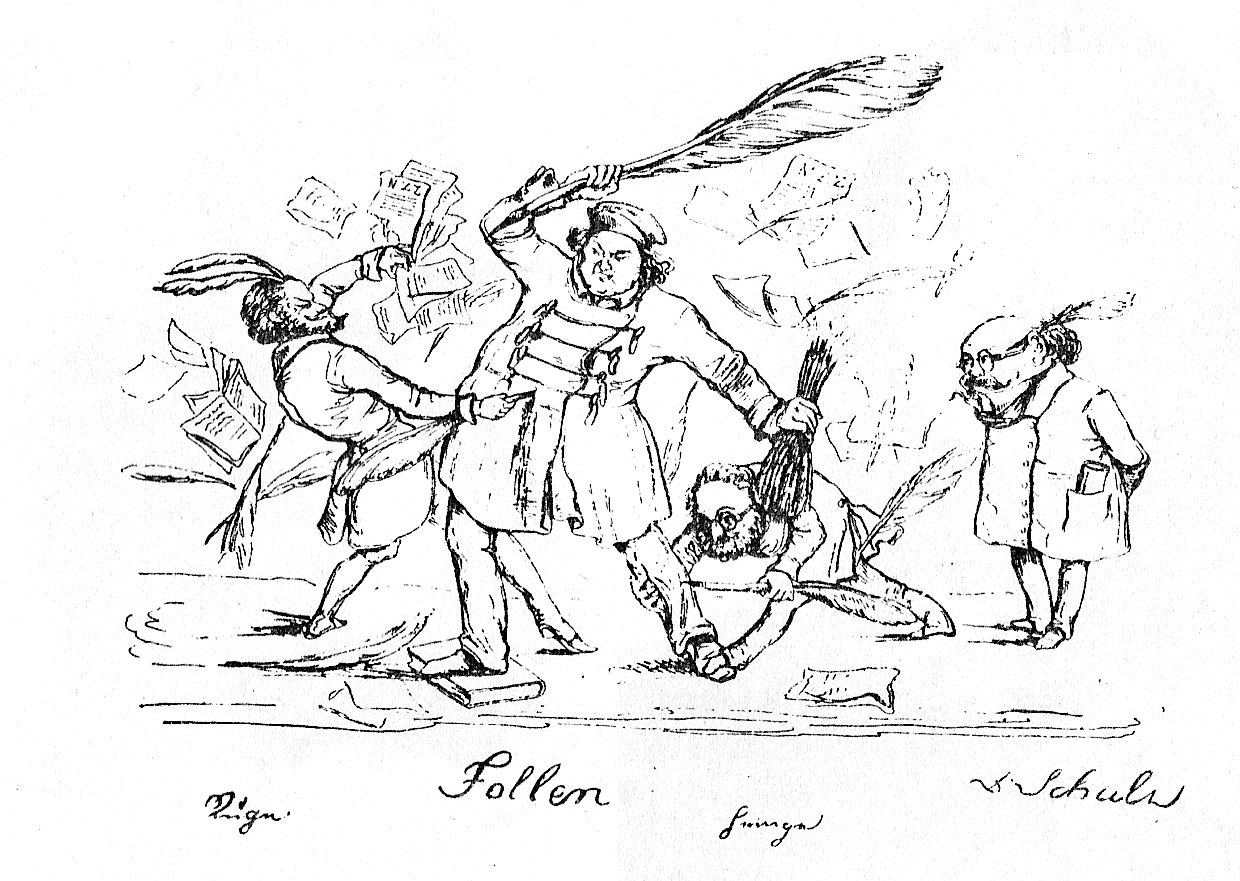
The Argument about Atheism in Zurich: (left to right) Arnold Ruge, A. L. Follen, Karl Heinzen, F. W. Schulz

In 1846 he published a brief collection of sonnets entitled An die gottlosen Nichtswüteriche (To the godless nothing maniacs). This was aimed at the liberal Hegelian philosophers Arnold Ruge and Karl Heinzen, and was the occasion of a literary duel between Follen and Ruge where Follen fronted for a belief in God and immortality. Follen's posthumous poem Tristans Eltern (1857), was notable, but his best-known work is a collection of German poetry entitled Bildersaal deutscher Dichtung (1827).

== Family ==
He was the brother of Charles Follen and Paul Follen, who both emigrated to the United States. Biologist Carl Vogt was his nephew.
