= Charles Follen =

German poet, patriot, professor, and abolitionist (1796–1840)

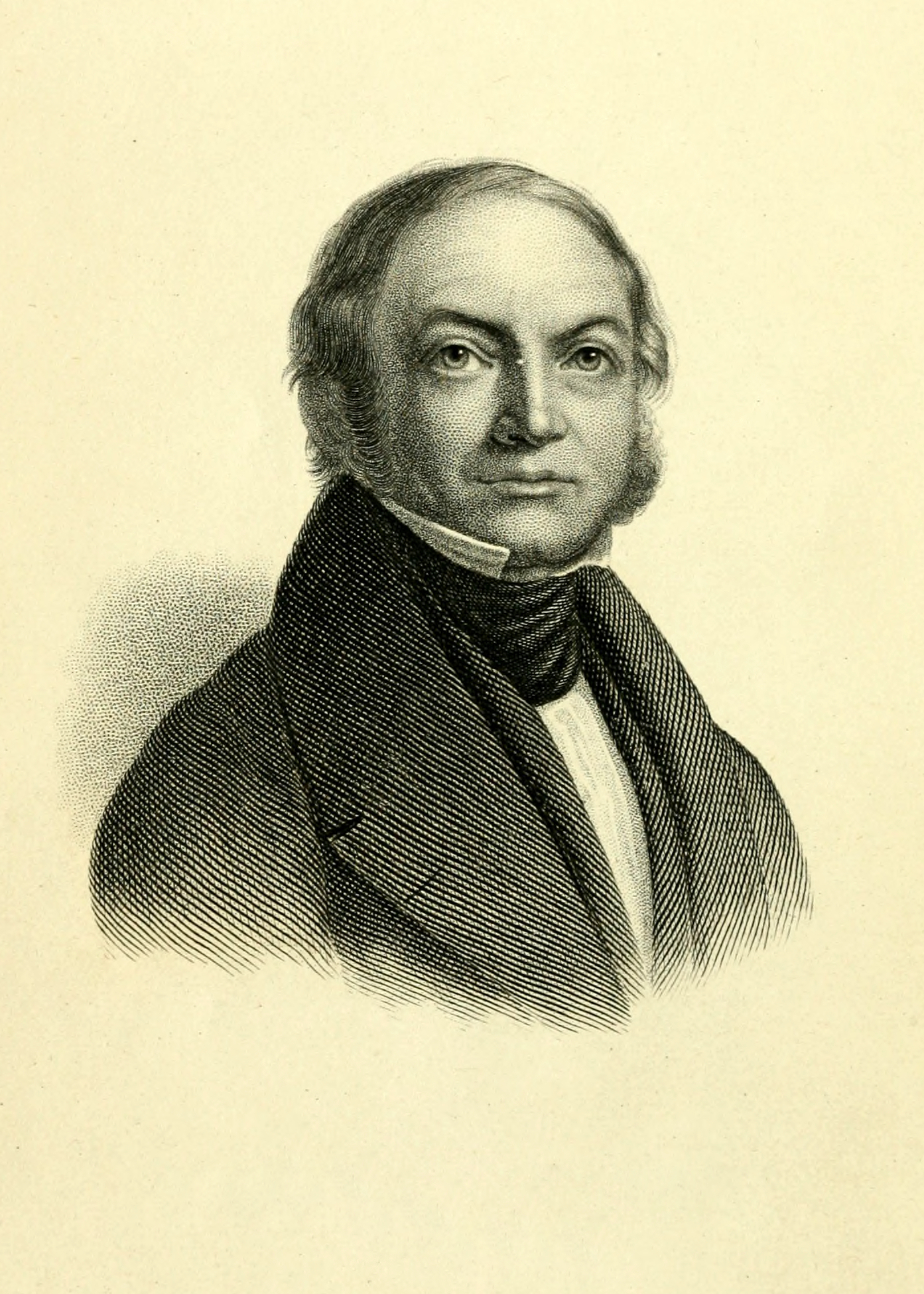
- Charles Follen
- Born: Karl Theodor Christian Friedrich Follen; September 6, 1796; Romrod, Hesse-Darmstadt, Holy Roman Empire
- Died: January 13, 1840 (aged 43); Long Island Sound
- Occupations: Poet, patriot
- Spouse: Eliza Lee Cabot (m. 1828)
- Children: Charles Christopher Follen

Charles (Karl) Theodor Christian Friedrich Follen (September 6, 1796 – January 13, 1840) was a German poet and patriot, who later moved to the United States and became the first professor of German at Harvard University, a Unitarian minister, and a radical abolitionist. He was fired by Harvard for his abolitionist statements.

== Life in Europe ==
Karl Theodor Christian Friedrich Follen was born at Romrod, in Hesse-Darmstadt (present-day Germany), to Christoph Follenius (1759–1833) and Rosine Follenius (1766–1799). His father was a counselor-at-law and judge in Giessen, in Hesse-Darmstadt. His mother had retired to Romrod to avoid the French revolutionary troops that had occupied Giessen. He was the brother of August Ludwig Follen and Paul Follen, and the uncle of the biologist Carl Vogt.

He was educated at the preparatory school at Giessen, where he distinguished himself for proficiency in Greek, Latin, Hebrew, French, and Italian. At the age of seventeen, he entered the University of Giessen to study theology. In 1814 he and his brother August Ludwig went to fight in the Napoleonic Wars as Hessian volunteers; however, a few weeks after enlisting, his military career was cut short by an acute attack of typhus fever, which seemed for a time to have completely destroyed his memory. After his recovery he returned to the university and began studying law, and in 1818 was awarded a doctorate in civil and ecclesiastical law. He then established himself as Privatdocent of civil law at Giessen, while simultaneously studying the practice of law in his father's court. As a student, Follen joined the Giessen Burschenschaft, whose members were pledged to republican ideals. Though he did not attend himself, Follen was a major organizer of the first Wartburg festival of 1817.

Early in the fall of 1818, he undertook the cause of several hundred communities in Upper Hesse in opposition to a government measure directed at the last remnant of their political independence, and drew up a petition to the grand duke on their behalf. It was printed and widely circulated, and aroused public indignation to such a pitch that the obnoxious measure was repealed. However, the opposition of the influential men whose plans were thereby thwarted precluded any thought of a career in Follen's home town. He became a Privatdozent at the University of Jena in October 1818.

At Jena, he wrote political essays, poems, and patriotic songs. His essays and speeches advocated violence and tyrannicide in defense of freedom; this, and his friendship with Karl Ludwig Sand brought him under suspicion as an accomplice in Sand's 1819 assassination of the conservative diplomat and dramatist August von Kotzebue. Follen destroyed letters linking him with Sand. He was arrested, but finally acquitted due to lack of evidence. His dismissal from the university and continuing lack of opportunity prompted him to move to Paris. There he met Charles Comte, the son-in-law of Jean Baptiste Say and founder of the Censeur, a publication which he defended until he chose exile in Switzerland over imprisonment in France. He also became acquainted with Marquis de Lafayette, who was then planning his trip to the United States. Follen came under suspicion again after the political assassination of Charles Ferdinand, duc de Berry in 1820, and fled from France to Switzerland.

In Switzerland, he taught Latin and history for a while at the cantonal school of the Grisons at Coire. His lectures, with their Unitarian tendencies, offended some of the Calvinistic ministers in the district, so Follen requested and obtained a dismissal, with a testimonial to his ability, learning, and worth. He then became a lecturer on law and metaphysics at the University of Basel. At Basel, he made the acquaintance of the theologian Wilhelm de Wette and his stepson Karl Beck. Both Follen and Charles Comte were forced to leave Switzerland. In Follen's case, demands were made by the German government for his surrender as a revolutionist. These were twice refused, but after a third (more threatening) demand, Basel yielded, passing a resolution for Follen's arrest. In 1824 Follen and Beck left Switzerland for the United States of America via Le Havre, France.

== Life in the United States ==
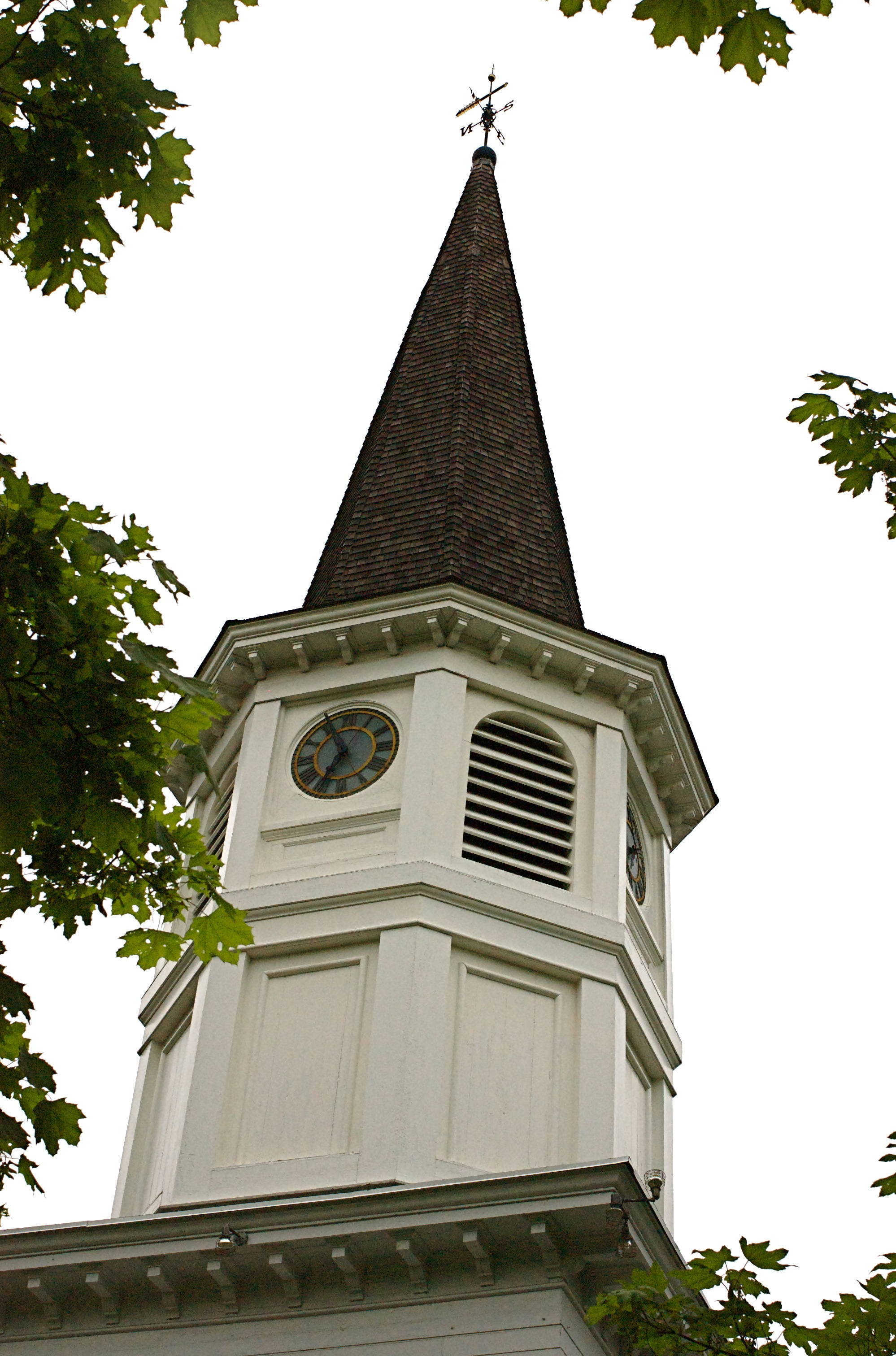
Follen Community Church

Arriving at New York City in 1824, Follen anglicized his name to "Charles." Lafayette was then visiting the United States and sought to interest some people of influence in the two refugees, who had moved from New York City and settled in Philadelphia. Among those Lafayette contacted were Peter Stephen Du Ponceau, a prominent lawyer, and George Ticknor, a Harvard professor. Ticknor in turn interested George Bancroft.

With the help of these sympathetic people, the refugees established themselves in Massachusetts society. Beck quickly secured a position at Bancroft's Round Hill School in Northampton, Massachusetts, in February 1825. Follen continued to study the English language and law in Philadelphia, and in November 1825 took up an offer from Harvard University to be an instructor in German. In 1828 he became an instructor of ethics and ecclesiastical history at Harvard Divinity School, having in the meantime been admitted as a candidate for the ministry. In 1830 he was appointed professor of German literature at Harvard. He became friendly with the New England Transcendentalists, and helped introduce them to German Romantic thought. In 1828, he married Eliza Lee Cabot, the daughter of one Boston's most prominent families.

Follen also gave demonstrations of the new discipline of gymnastics, made popular by "Father Jahn". In 1824, Follen brought these skills to Turner Hall where he demonstrated the basics to American fitness circles. In 1826, at the request of a group in Boston, he established and equipped the first gymnasium there and became its superintendent. Follen resigned this position in 1827, and the responsibilities were taken over by Francis Lieber. With the assistance of Beck, Follen established the first college gymnasium in the United States at Harvard in 1826.

The Follens had a house built on the corner of Follen Street in Cambridge. Their family Christmas tree attracted the attention of the English writer Harriet Martineau during her long visit to the United States, and the Follens have been claimed by some as the first to introduce the German custom of decorated Christmas tree to the United States. (Although the claim is one of several competing claims for the introduction of the custom to the United States, they, together with Martineau, were certainly early and prominent popularizers of the custom.) His brother Paul Follen emigrated in 1834 to the United States, settling in Missouri.

In 1835, Charles Follen lost his professorship at Harvard due to his outspoken abolitionist beliefs and his conflict with University President Josiah Quincy's strict disciplinary measures for undergraduates. A close friend and associate of abolitionist William Lloyd Garrison, Follen's outspoken opposition to slavery had incurred the hostility and scorn of the public press. Like most of the early radical abolitionists, Follen at the beginning was censured by public opinion even in the locality which later became the centre of the abolition spirit. The good beginning that had been made in the study of the German language in New England was totally discontinued. The cause of German literature had still a friend in Henry Wadsworth Longfellow, who in 1838 began his lectures on Johann von Goethe's Faust.

Follen's friendship with the prominent Unitarian minister William Ellery Channing drew him to the Unitarian Church. He was ordained as a minister in 1836. He had been called to the pulpit of the Second Congregational Society in Lexington, Massachusetts (now Follen Church Society-Unitarian Universalist) in 1835, but the community was unable to pay him sufficiently to support his family. Follen took other employment; Ralph Waldo Emerson supplied the pulpit from 1836 to 1838 at the church. In 1838 Follen became the minister of his own congregation in New York City, now All Souls, but lost the position within the year due to conflicts over his radical anti-slavery views. He considered returning to Germany, but returned in 1839 to the congregation in East Lexington, Massachusetts. He had designed its unique octagonal building, for which ground was broken on July 4, 1839. Follen's octagonal building is still standing, and is the oldest church structure in Lexington. In his prayer at the groundbreaking for the building, Follen declared the mission of his church:

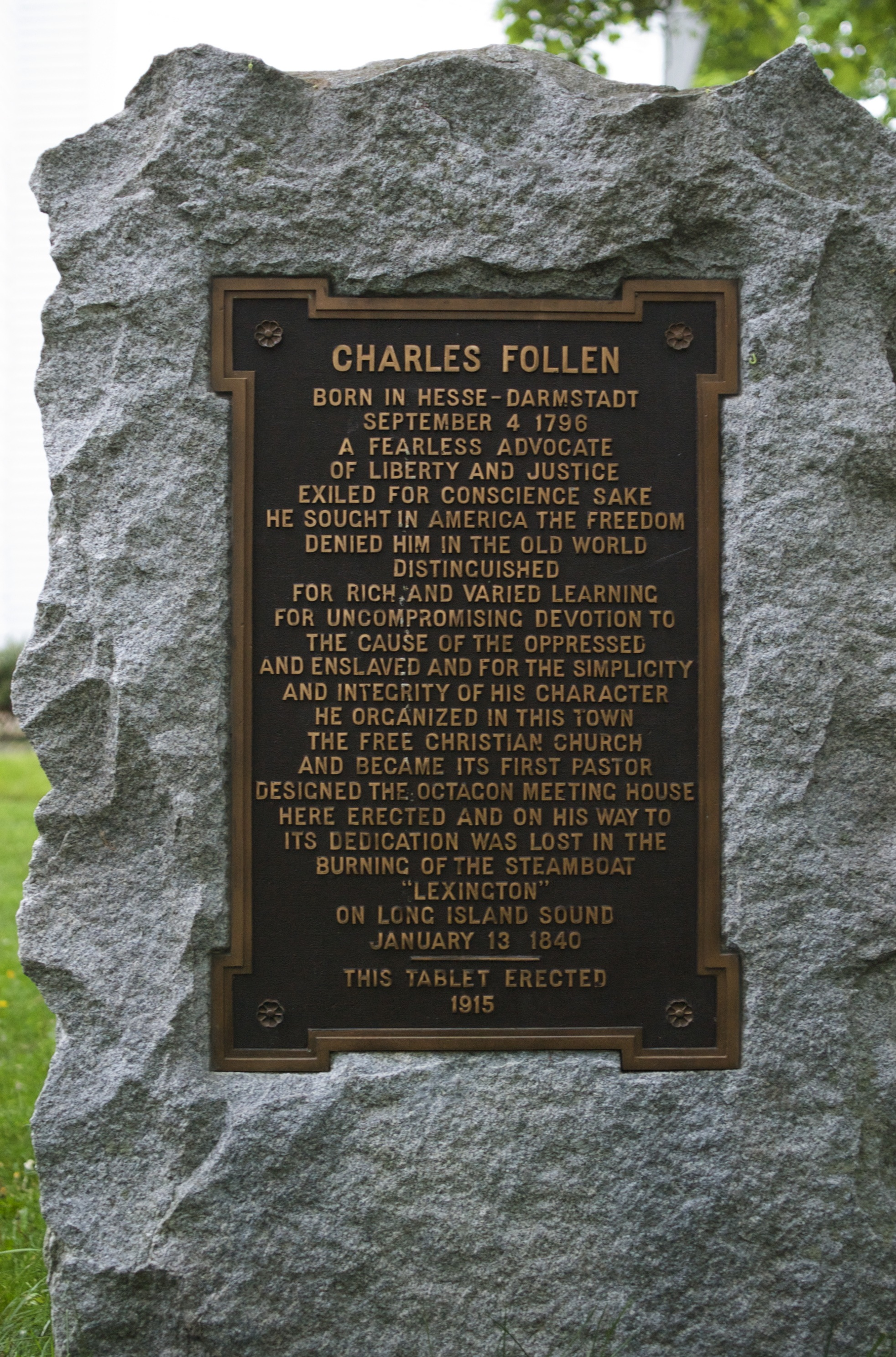
Memorial to Charles Follen in the churchyard

[May] this church never be desecrated by intolerance, or bigotry, or party spirit; more especially its doors might never be closed against any one, who would plead in it the cause of oppressed humanity; within its walls all unjust and cruel distinctions might cease, and [there] all men might meet as brethren.

Follen broke off a lecture tour in New York and took the Steamship Lexington to Boston for the dedication of his new church. Follen died en route when his steamer caught fire and sank in a storm in the Long Island Sound. Due to Follen's abolitionist positions, his friends were unable to find any church in Boston willing to hold a memorial service on his behalf. Rev. Samuel J. May was finally able to hold a memorial service for Follen in March 1840 at the Marlborough Chapel. This was an unaffiliated hall attached to the Marlborough Hotel on the corner of Washington Street and Franklin Street in Boston.

== Works ==
- Psychology (1836)
- Essay on Religion and the Church (1836)
- Charles Follen (1837), A practical grammar of the German language (3rd ed.), Boston, Wikidata Q115695078

In 1841, Follen's widow Eliza, a well-known author in her own right, published a five-volume collection containing his sermons and lectures, his unfinished sketch of a work on psychology and a biography she wrote.
