= Carl Vogt =

German scientist, philosopher and politician (1817–1895)

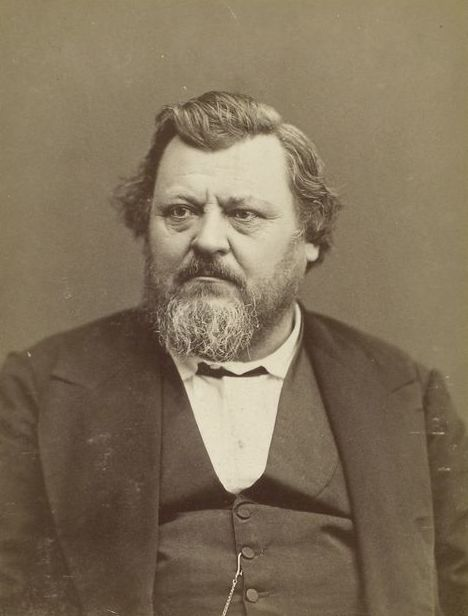
- Vogt c. 1870
- Born: August Christoph Carl Vogt; 5 July 1817; Gießen, Grand Duchy of Hesse
- Died: 5 May 1895 (aged 77); Geneva, Switzerland

Education
- Education: University of Giessen; University of Bern (M.D., 1839)

Philosophical work
- Era: 19th-century philosophy
- Region: Western philosophy
- School: German materialism
- Institutions: University of Giessen; University of Geneva
- Main interests: Philosophy of science, political philosophy
- Notable ideas: Polygenism

Signature
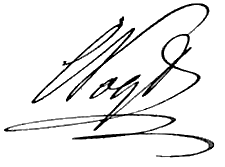

August Christoph Carl Vogt (/fɔːkt/; German: [foːkt]; 5 July 1817 – 5 May 1895) was a German scientist, philosopher, popularizer of science, and politician who emigrated to Switzerland. Vogt published a number of notable works on zoology, geology and physiology. All his life he was engaged in politics, in the German Frankfurt Parliament of 1848–49 and later in Switzerland.

== Early life ==
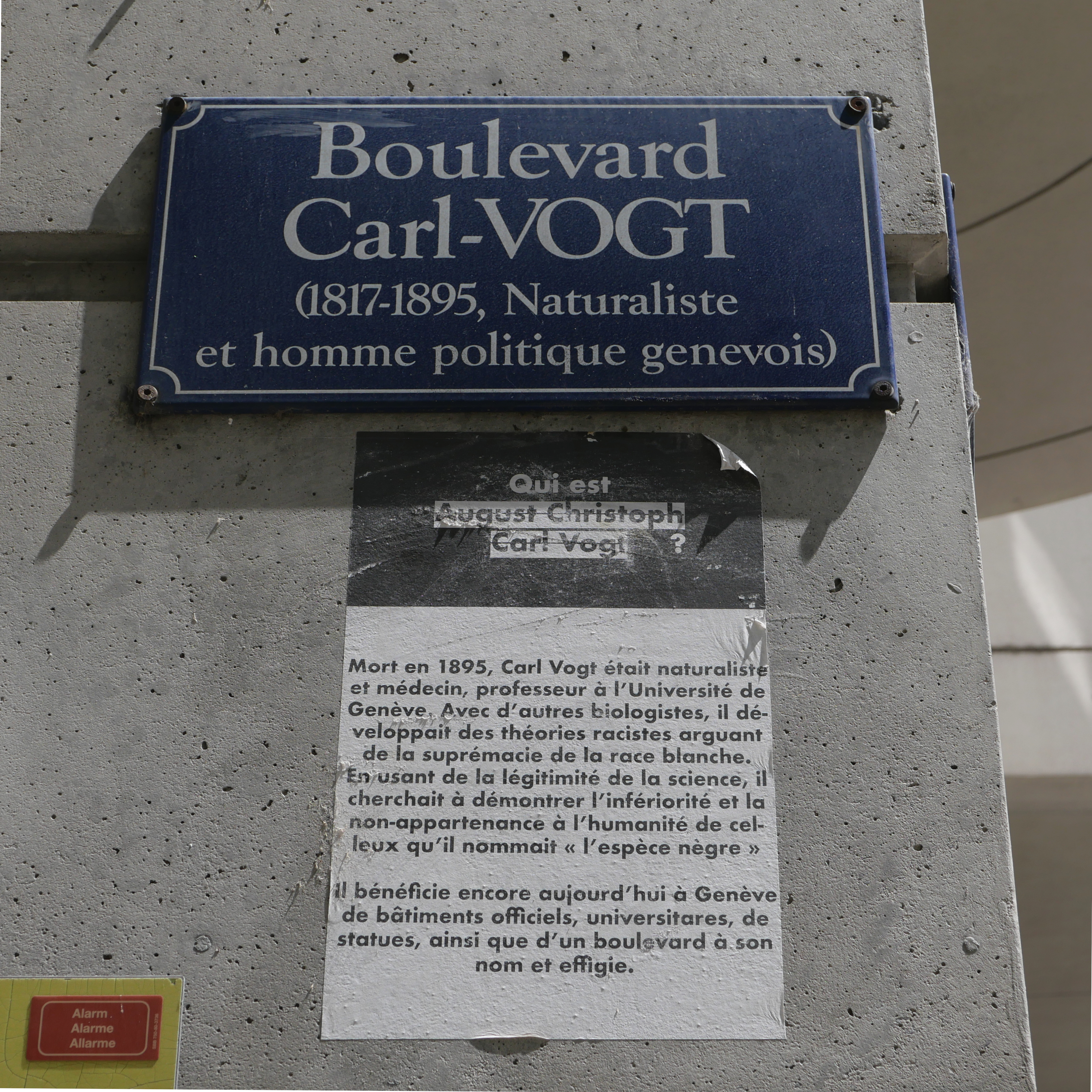
Street sign in Geneva with a poster denouncing Vogt's theories as white-supremacist, criticising the naming of the street, official buildings etc. after him and the presence of his bust in front of the university

Vogt was born in Giessen, the son of Philipp Friedrich Wilhelm Vogt, professor of clinics, and Louise Follenius. His maternal uncle was Charles Follen. From 1833 to 1836, he studied medicine at the University of Giessen, and continued his training in Bern, Switzerland, earning his PhD in 1839. He then worked with Louis Agassiz in Neuchâtel.

== Life and career ==
In 1847 he became professor of zoology at the University of Giessen, and in 1852 professor of geology and afterwards also of zoology at the University of Geneva. His earlier publications were on zoology. He dealt with the Amphibia (1839), Reptiles (1840), with Mollusca and Crustacea (1845) and more generally with the invertebrate fauna of the Mediterranean (1854). In 1842, during his time with Louis Agassiz, he discovered the mechanism of apoptosis, the programmed cell death, while studying the development of the tadpole of the midwife toad (Alytes obstetricans). Charles Darwin mentions Vogt's support for the theory of evolution in the introduction to his The Descent of Man, and Selection in Relation to Sex (1871).

Vogt was a proponent of scientific materialism and atheism, eager to engage in public debates with philosophical and scientific opponents, such as in his work Köhlerglaube und Wissenschaft of 1855, which was reprinted four times the same year.

Vogt defended the theory of polygenist evolution; he rejected the monogenist beliefs of most Darwinists and instead believed that each race had evolved from a different type of ape. He wrote the White race was a separate species from Negroes. In Chapter VII of his Lectures on Man (1864), he compared the Negro to the White race and described them as “two extreme human types”. The differences between them, he claimed, are greater than those between two species of ape; and this proved that Negroes are a separate species from Whites. He was elected as a member to the American Philosophical Society in 1869. He died in Geneva at the age of 77.

== Politics ==
Vogt was active in German politics and was a left-wing representative in the Frankfurt Parliament.

During 1859 and 1860, Vogt engaged in a protracted polemic with Karl Marx, who had accused him "without much evidence, but, as later events showed, correctly, of intriguing in support of Napoleon III. Additionally, Marx took umbrage to the "crude and vulgar" form of materialism being espoused by Vogt at the time, publishing a book in 1860, Herr Vogt, to publicize his views.

Years later, in 1870, with the fall of the Second Empire, French Republic under the Government of National Defense put up a "Commission chargée de réunir, classer et publier les papiers saisis aux Tuileries" ("Commission responsible for collecting, classifying and publishing the papers seized at the Tuileries") under the chairmanship of André Lavertujon to publish the documents that survived the Tuileries Palace fire. In the published documents there was a list, prepared with the collaboration of André Lefèvre, that revealed some of the Bonapartist agents, among them, a man named Vogt: "Vogt (?). Il lui est remis, en août 1859, 40,000 fr." ("Vogt (?). He was given, in August 1859, 40.000 francs.")

After this publication, this issue also was handled in German Marxist/social-democratic papers. Newspaper Der Volksstaat published these passages in April 15. In Der Volksstaat's May 10 issue, Engels, with his article "Abermals „Herr Vogt“" ("Once again on Herr Vogt") further commented on the identity of the person named as "Vogt (?)", and claimed it being Carl Vogt. Engels explained:

Vogt? Who is Vogt? What a misfortune for Vogt that the description was not more specific! Had it said, Professor Karl Vogt in Geneva, giving the name of the street and the number of his house, Vogt could have said: It's not me, it's my brother, my wife, my eldest son—anyone but me—but as things stand! Just plain Vogt without title, first name, address—well, that can only be the one Vogt, the world-famous scholar, the great discoverer of the round-worms and the flat-worms, of the long skulls and the short skulls, and of the Brimstone Gang, the man whose reputation is so well known, even to the police administering the secret fund, that any more detailed description would be superfluous! And then—is there any other Vogt who could have rendered such services to the Bonapartist government in 1859 that it should have paid him 40,000 francs in the August of that year (and Vogt just happened to be in Paris at the time)? That you rendered the services, Herr Vogt, is public knowledge. Your Studies are the proof of it. The first edition of those Studies came out in the spring, the second appeared in the summer. You yourself have admitted that you offered many people money to act in the Bonapartist interests from April 1, 1859 until well into the summer of that year. In August 1859, after the war had come to an end, you were in Paris—and are we now supposed to believe that the Vogt to whom Bonaparte paid out 40,000 francs in August 1859 was another, wholly unknown Vogt? Impossible. We swear by all round-worms and flat-worms: until you can prove the opposite to us, we must assume that you are the Vogt in question.

This revelation was later adapted by other Marxists and Marxologists too, and since then being canonized. Marx's daughter, Eleanor Marx, in her biography of her father published after his death, also mentioned this affair. This question was mentioned in numerous Marxist texts, notably, publications of Herr Vogt or about Carl Vogt.

== Honors ==
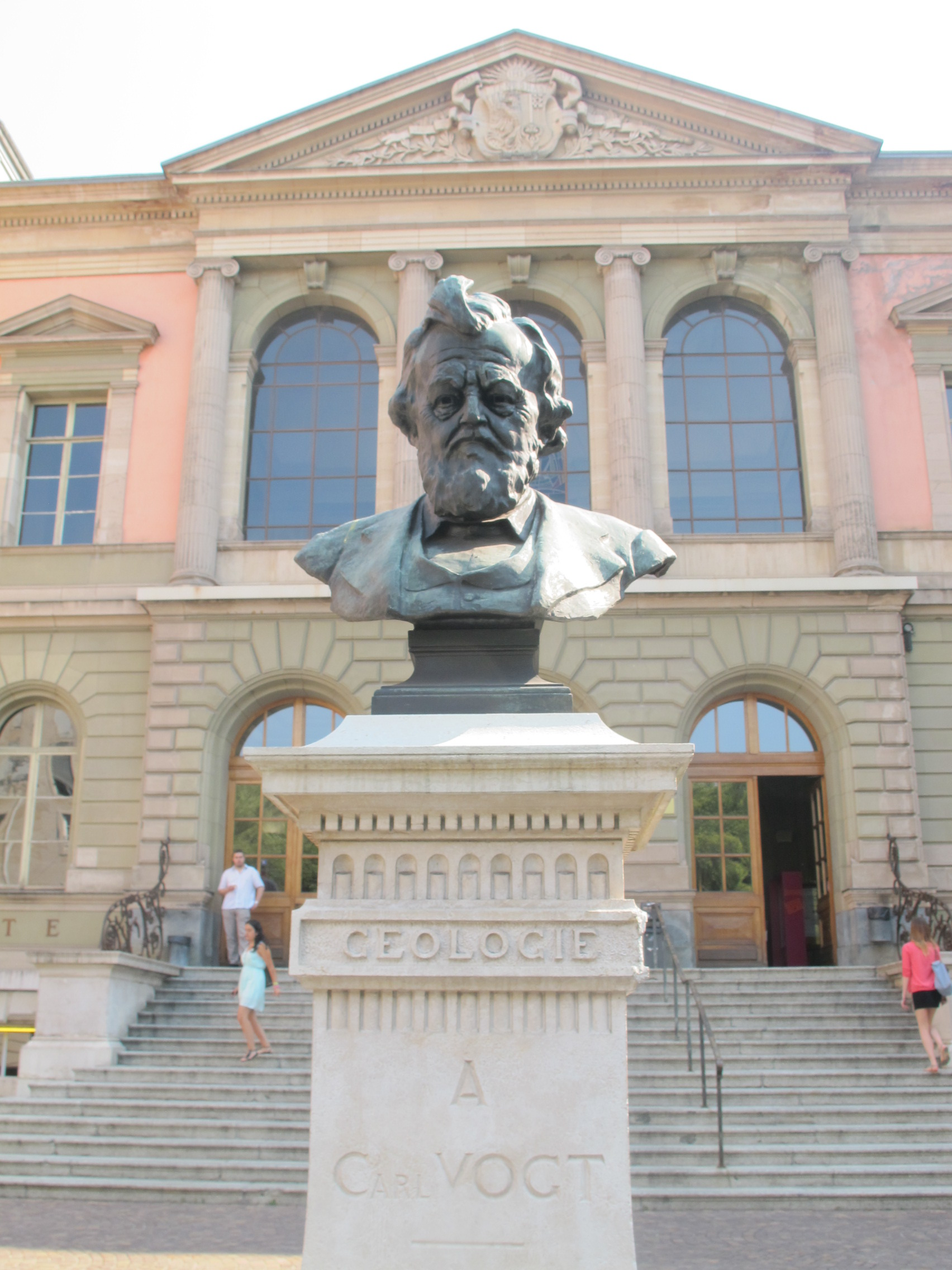
Bust of Carl Vogt in front of the University of Geneva

The city of Geneva, Switzerland named a boulevard (Boulevard Carl-Vogt) after Vogt and erected a memorial bust in front of a building of the University of Geneva. In September 2022, the university board of the University of Geneva decided to change the name of a university building named after Carl Vogt due to his racist and sexist theories.

== Works ==
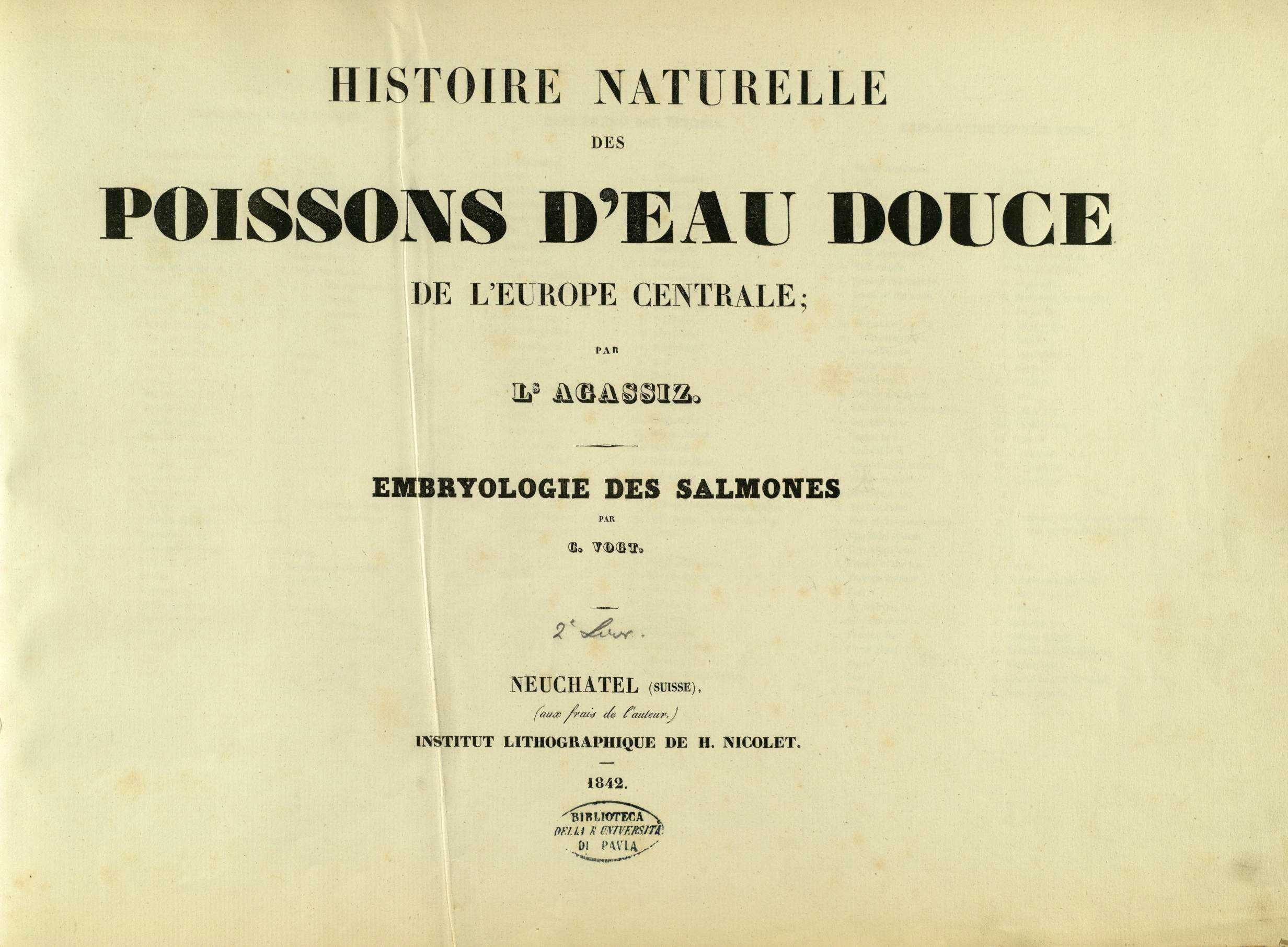
Histoire naturelle des poissons d'eau douce de l'Europe centrale, 1842

- Histoire naturelle des poissons d'eau douce de l'Europe centrale (in French). Neuchâtel: Nicolet. 1842.
- An English version of his Lectures on Man: his Place in Creation and in the History of the Earth was published by the Anthropological Society of London in 1864.

== See also ==
- Plainpalais
