= Dutzow, Missouri =

Unincorporated community in Warren County, Missouri, United States

Coordinates: 38°36′20″N 90°59′41″W

Dutzow (/ˈdʌtzoʊ/ DUT-zoh or /ˈduːtzoʊ/ DOOT-zoh) is an unincorporated community in southeastern Warren County, Missouri, United States. It is located on Route 94, approximately three miles north of Washington. Located near the Missouri River, it is one of the oldest German communities in the state.

== History ==
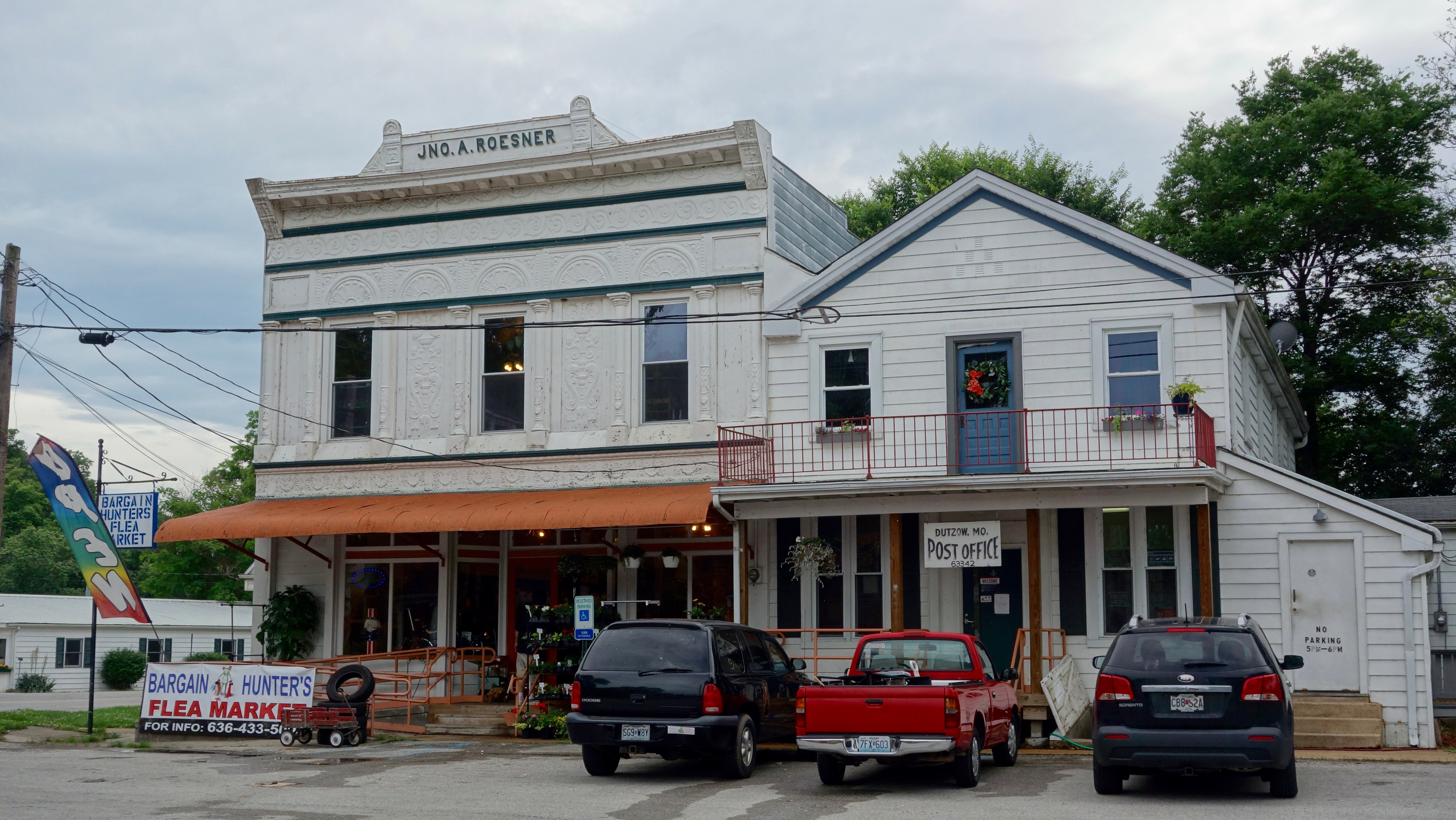
Dutzow Post Office, June 2015

The Berlin Society established a settlement at present-day Dutzow in the 1830s. For this reason, it is often considered a "Latin Settlement". A post office called Dutzow has been in operation since 1869. According to tradition, the community was named after Dutzow in northeast Germany, the ancestral home of one of the first settlers, Johann Wilhelm Bock.

Located along the Katy Trail, Dutzow sees considerable tourism each year. It is also the home of Blumenhof Vineyard & Winery. Another tourism draw is the Saint Vincent de Paul Church, constructed in 1874.
