= German revolutions of 1848–1849 =

German part of the Revolutions of 1848

German revolution of 1848–1849
- Part of the Revolutions of 1848 and the unification of Germany
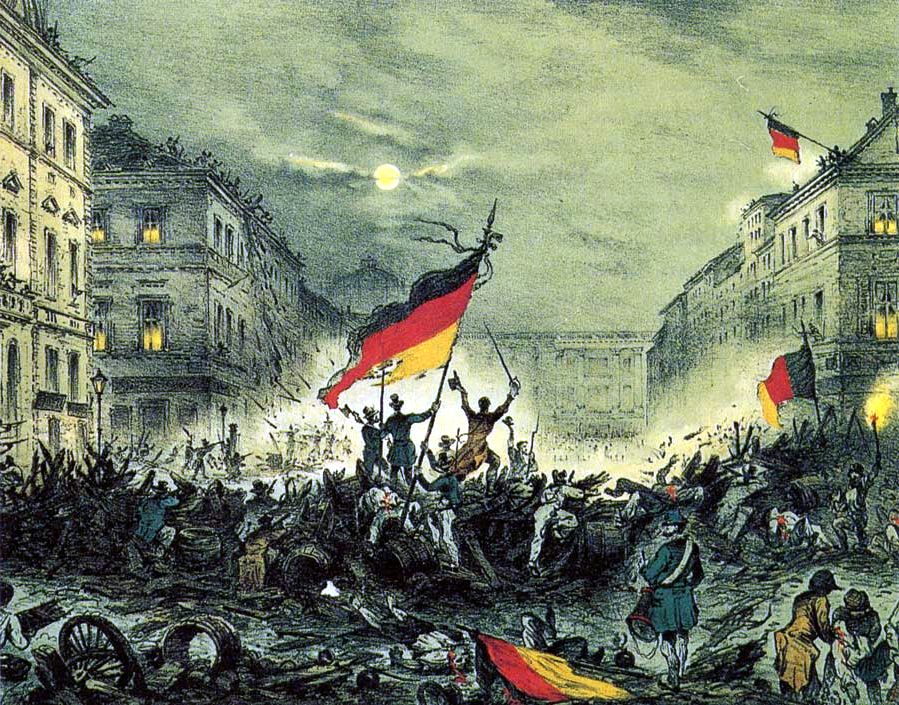
- Origin of the Flag of Germany: Cheering revolutionaries in Berlin, Berlin Palace in the background, on 19 March 1848
Date	February 1848 – July 1849
Location	German states, Central Europe
Result	Rebellion quelled: Establishment of German state and introduction of liberal constitution

Belligerents
German Confederation: Kingdom of Saxony; Kingdom of Prussia; Austrian Empire	German Empire; German revolutionaries

Commanders and leaders
Frederick Augustus II; Frederick William IV; Klemens von Metternich	Robert Blum Friedrich Hecker

Strength
~45,000 German Federal Army	~400,000 among peasants and workers

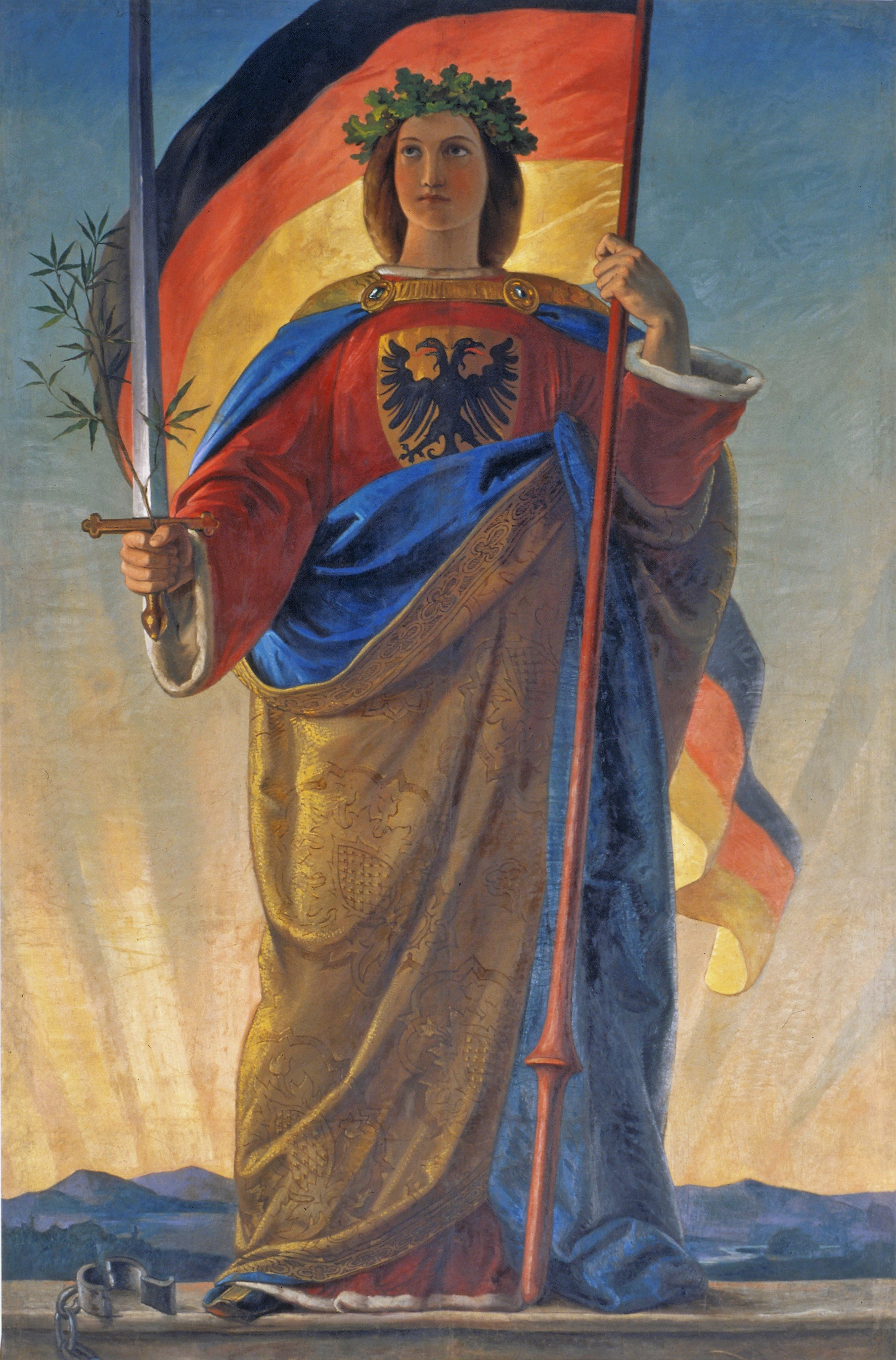
The painting Germania, possibly by Philipp Veit, hung inside the Frankfurt parliament, the first national parliament in German history

The German revolutions of 1848–1849 (German: Deutsche Revolution 1848/1849), the opening phase of which was also called the March Revolution (German: Märzrevolution), were initially part of the Revolutions of 1848 that broke out in many European countries. They were a series of loosely coordinated protests and rebellions in the states of the German Confederation, including the Austrian Empire. The revolutions, which stressed pan-Germanism, liberalism, and parliamentarianism, demonstrated popular discontent with the traditional, largely autocratic political structure of the 39 independent states of the Confederation that inherited the German territory of the former Holy Roman Empire after its dismantlement as a result of the Napoleonic Wars. This process began in the mid-1840s.

The middle-class elements were committed to liberal principles, while the working class sought radical improvements to their working and living conditions. As the middle- and working-class components of the Revolution split, the conservative aristocracy defeated it. Liberals were forced into exile to escape political persecution, where they became known as Forty-Eighters. Many emigrated to the United States, settling from Wisconsin to Texas.

== Events leading up to the revolutions ==
The groundwork of the 1848 uprising was laid as early as the Hambacher Fest of 1832, when public unrest began to grow in the face of heavy taxation and political censorship. The Hambacher Fest is also noteworthy for the Republicans' adoption of the black-red-gold colours used on today's national flag of Germany as a symbol of the Republican movement and unity among German-speaking people. The song "Fürsten zum Land Hinaus!" originated from the festival, and quickly garnered popular support for the abolition of monarchy and establishment of a republic.

Activism for liberal reforms spread through many of the German states, each of which had a distinct revolution. It was also inspired by the street demonstrations led by workers and artisans in Paris, which took place through 22 to 24 February 1848 and resulted in the abdication of King Louis-Philippe of France and his exile to Britain. In France the revolution of 1848 became known as the February Revolution.

The revolutions spread from France across Europe; demonstrations against the government erupted soon thereafter in both Austria and Germany, beginning with large protests on 13 March 1848 in Vienna. This resulted in the resignation of Prince von Metternich as chief minister to Emperor Ferdinand I of Austria and his exile in Britain. Because of the date of the Vienna demonstrations, the protests throughout Germany are usually called the March Revolution (German: Märzrevolution).

Afraid of suffering the same fate as Louis-Philippe of France, some German monarchs acquiesced to the revolutionaries' demands, at least temporarily. In the south and west, large popular assemblies and mass demonstrations took place. They demanded freedom of the press, freedom of assembly, written constitutions, arming of the people, and a parliament.

== Austria ==
In 1848, Austria was the predominant German state. After the collapse of the Holy Roman Empire, which had been dissolved by Napoleon in 1806, it was succeeded by a similarly loose coalition of states known as the German Confederation at the Congress of Vienna in 1815. Austria served as President ex officio of this confederation. The (German) Austrian chancellor Klemens von Metternich dominated Austrian politics from 1815 until 1848.

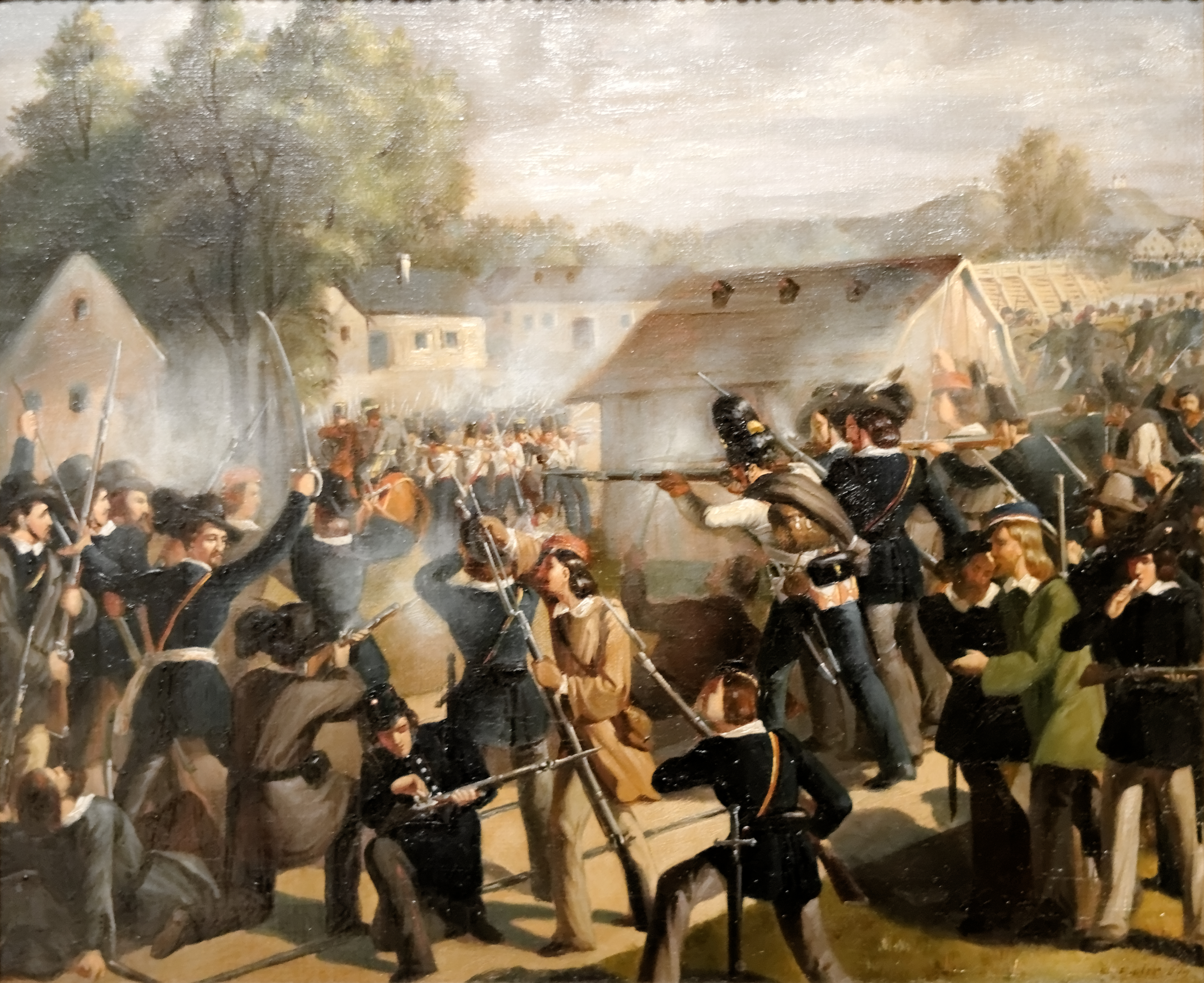
Vienna Uprising, October 1848

On 13 March 1848, university students mounted a large street demonstration in Vienna, and it was covered by the press across the German-speaking states. After the important but relatively minor demonstrations against Lola Montez in Bavaria on 9 February 1848, the first major revolt of 1848 in German lands occurred in Vienna on 13 March 1848. The demonstrating students in Vienna had been restive and were encouraged by a sermon of Anton Füster, a liberal priest, on 12 March 1848 in the university chapel. The student demonstrators demanded a constitution and a constituent assembly elected by universal male suffrage.

Emperor Ferdinand and his chief advisor Metternich directed troops to crush the demonstration. When demonstrators moved to the streets near the Hofburg, the troops fired on the demonstrating students, killing several of them. The new working class of Vienna joined the student demonstrations, developing an armed insurrection. The Diet of Lower Austria demanded Metternich's resignation. With no forces rallying to Metternich's defense, Ferdinand reluctantly complied and dismissed him. The former chancellor went into exile in London.

Ferdinand appointed new, nominally liberal, ministers. The Austrian government drafted a constitution in late April 1848. The people rejected it, as it denied the majority the right to vote. The citizens of Vienna returned to the streets on 26 and 27 May, erecting barricades to prepare for an army attack. Ferdinand and his family fled to Innsbruck, where they spent the next few months surrounded by the loyal peasantry of the Tyrol. Ferdinand issued manifestos on 16 May and 3 June that gave concessions to the people. He converted the Imperial Diet into a Constituent Assembly to be elected by the people. Other concessions were less substantial, and generally addressed Germany's reorganization and unification.

Ferdinand returned to Vienna from Innsbruck on 12 August. The working-class populace hit the streets again on 21 August to protest high unemployment and the government's decree to reduce wages. On 23 August, Austrian troops opened fire on unarmed demonstrators and shot several of them.

In late September, Ferdinand, who was also King Ferdinand V of Hungary, sent Austrian and Croatian troops to Hungary to crush a democratic rebellion there. On 29 September, the Austrian troops were defeated by the Hungarian revolutionary forces. On 6 and 7 October, the citizens of Vienna had demonstrated against Ferdinand's actions in Hungary, resulting in the Vienna Uprising. As a result, Ferdinand fled Vienna on 7 October and took up residence in the fortress town of Olomouc in Moravia. On 2 December, he abdicated in favour of his nephew Franz Joseph.

== Baden ==
Baden had a liberal constitution from 1811 until reaction resulted in Grand Duke Louis I revoking the constitution in 1825. In 1830, Leopold became Grand Duke. His reign brought liberal reforms in constitutional, civil and criminal law, and in education. In 1832 Baden joined the Prussian Customs Union. After news broke of revolutionary victories in February 1848 in Paris, uprisings occurred throughout Europe, including Austria and the German states.

Baden was the first state in Germany to have popular unrest, despite Baden being one of the most liberal states in Germany. After the news of the February Days in Paris reached Baden, there were several unorganized instances of peasants burning the mansions of local aristocrats and threatening them.

On 27 February 1848, in Mannheim, an assembly of people from Baden adopted a resolution demanding a bill of rights. Similar resolutions were adopted in Württemberg, Hesse-Darmstadt, Nassau, and other German states. The surprisingly strong popular support for these movements forced rulers to give in to many of the Märzforderungen (demands of March) almost without resistance.

The March Revolution in Vienna was a catalyst to revolution throughout the German states. Popular demands were made for an elected representative government and for the unification of Germany. Fear on the part of the princes and rulers of the various German states caused them to concede in the demand for reform. They approved a provisional parliament, which was convened from 31 March 1848, until 4 April 1848, in St. Paul's Church in Frankfurt am Main, charged with the task of drafting a new constitution, to be called the "Fundamental Rights and Demands of the German People." The majority of the delegates to the provisional parliament were constitutional monarchists.

Baden sent two democrats, Friedrich Hecker and Gustav von Struve, to the provisional parliament. In the minority and frustrated with the lack of progress, Hecker and Struve walked out in protest on 2 April 1848. The walkout and the continuing revolutionary upsurge in Germany spurred the provisional parliament to action; they passed a resolution calling for an All-German National Assembly to be formed.

On 8 April 1848, a law allowing universal suffrage and an indirect (two-stage) voting system was agreed to by the assembly. A new National Assembly was selected, and on 18 May 1848, 809 delegates (585 of whom were elected) were seated at St. Paul's Church in Frankfurt to convene the Frankfurt Parliament. Karl Mathy, a right-center journalist, was among those elected as deputy to the Frankfurt National Assembly.

Disorder fomented by republican agitators continued in Baden. Fearing greater riots, the Baden government began to increase the size of its army and to seek assistance from neighboring states. The Baden government sought to suppress the revolts by arresting Joseph Fickler, a journalist who was the leader of the Baden democrats. The arrests caused outrage and a rise in protests. A full-scale uprising broke out on 12 April 1848. The Bavarian government suppressed the revolutionary forces led by Hecker with the aid of Prussian troops at the Battle on the Scheideck on 20 April 1848, ending what became known as the Hecker uprising.

== The Palatinate ==
When the revolutionary upsurge revived in the spring of 1849, the uprisings started in Elberfeld in the Rhineland on 6 May 1849. However, the uprisings soon spread to the Grand Duchy of Baden, when a riot broke out in Karlsruhe. The state of Baden and the Palatinate (then part of the Kingdom of Bavaria) were separated only by the Rhine. The uprising in Baden and the Palatinate took place largely in the Rhine Valley along their mutual border, and are considered aspects of the same movement. In May 1849, the Grand Duke was forced to leave Karlsruhe, Baden and seek help from Prussia. Provisional governments were declared in both the Palatinate and Baden. In Baden conditions for the provisional government were ideal: the public and army were both strongly in support of constitutional change and democratic reform in the government. The army strongly supported the demands for a constitution; the state had amply supplied arsenals, and a full exchequer. The Palatinate did not have the same conditions.

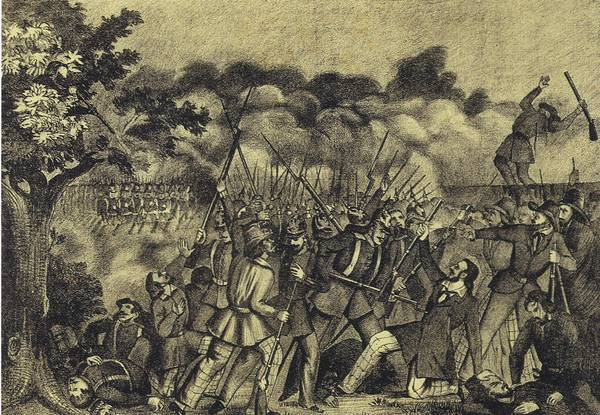
The Battle of Kirchheimbolanden, 14 June 1849

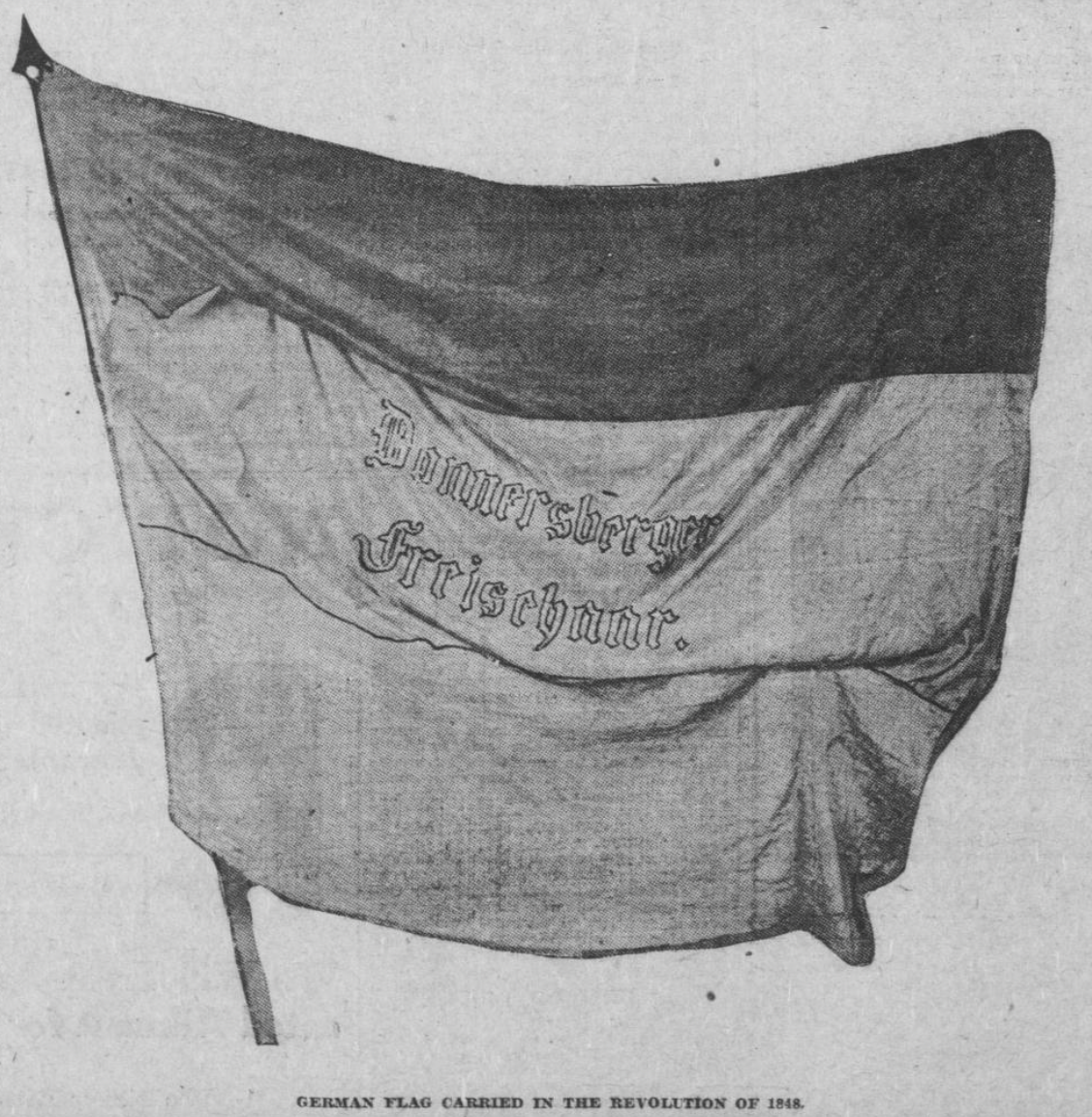
Regimental flag carried by insurgents

The Palatinate traditionally contained more upper-class citizens than other areas of Germany, and they resisted the revolutionary changes. In the Palatinate, the army did not support the revolution, and it was not well supplied. When the insurrectionary government took over in the Palatinate, they did not find a fully organized state or a full exchequer. Arms in the Palatinate were limited to privately held muskets, rifles and sporting guns. The provisional government of the Palatinate sent agents to France and Belgium to purchase arms but they were unsuccessful. France banned sales and export of arms to either Baden or the Palatinate.

The provisional government first appointed Joseph Martin Reichard, a lawyer, democrat and deputy in the Frankfurt Assembly, as the head of the military department in the Palatinate. The first Commander in Chief of the military forces of the Palatinate was Daniel Fenner von Fenneberg, a former Austrian officer who commanded the national guard in Vienna during the 1848 uprising. He was soon replaced by Felix Raquilliet, a former Polish staff general in the Polish insurgent army of 1830–1831. Finally Ludwik Mieroslawski was given supreme command of the armed forces in the Palatinate, and Franz Sznayde was given field command of the troops.

Other noteworthy military officers serving the provisional government in the city of Kaiserslautern, were Friedrich Strasser, Alexander Schimmelpfennig, Captain Rudolph von Manteuffel, Albert Clement, Herr Zychlinski, Friedrich von Beust, Eugen Oswald, Amand Goegg, Gustav Struve, Otto Julius Bernhard von Corvin-Wiersbitzki, Joseph Moll, Johann Gottfried Kinkel, Herr Mersy, Karl Emmermann, Franz Sigel, Major Nerlinger, Colonel Kurz, Friedrich Karl, Franz Hecker and Herman von Natzmer. Hermann von Natzmer was the former Prussian officer who had been in charge of the arsenal of Berlin. Refusing to shoot insurgent forces who stormed the arsenal on 14 June 1848, Natzmer became a hero to insurgents across Germany. He was sentenced to 15 years in prison for refusing orders to shoot, but in 1849, he escaped prison and fled to the Palatinate to join its insurgent forces. Gustav Adolph Techow, a former Prussian officer, also joined Palatinate forces. Organizing the artillery and providing services in the ordnance shops was Lieutenant Colonel Freidrich Anneke. He was a member of the Communist League and one of the founders of the Cologne Workers Association in 1848, editor of the Neue Kölnische Zeitung and a member of the Rhenish District Committee of Democrats.

Democrats of the Palatinate and across Germany considered the Baden-Palatinate insurrection to be part of the wider all-German struggle for constitutional rights. Franz Sigel, a second lieutenant in the Baden army, a democrat and a supporter of the provisional government, developed a plan to protect the reform movement in Karlsruhe and the Palatinate. He recommended using a corps of the Baden army to advance on the town of Hechingen and declare the Hohenzollern Republic, then to march on Stuttgart. After inciting Stuttgart and the surrounding Kingdom of Württemberg, the military corps would march to Nuremberg and set up camp in the state of Franconia. Sigel failed to account for dealing with the separate Free City of Frankfurt, the home of the Frankfurt Assembly, in order to establish an All-German character to the military campaign for the German constitution.

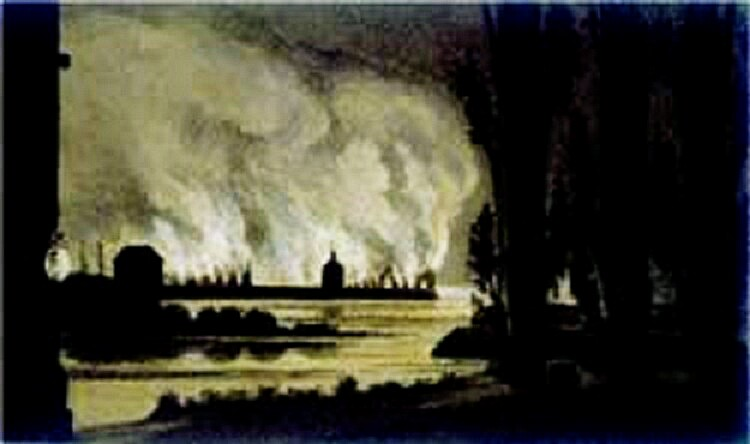
Ludwigshafen burns, 15 June 1849.

Despite Sigel's plan, the new insurgent government did not go on the offensive. The uprising in Karlsruhe and the Grand Duchy of Baden was eventually suppressed by the Bavarian Army. Lorenz Peter Brentano, a lawyer and democrat from Baden, headed its government, wielding absolute power. He appointed Karl Eichfeld as War Minister. Later, Eichfeld was replaced as War Minister by Rudolph Mayerhofer. Florian Mördes was appointed as Minister of the Interior. Other members of the provisional government included Joseph Fickler, a journalist and a democrat from Baden. Leaders of the constitutional forces in Baden included Karl Blind, a journalist and a democrat in Baden; and Gustav Struve, another journalist and democrat from Baden. John Phillip Becker was placed in charge of the peoples' militia. Ludwik Mieroslawski, a Polish-born national who had taken part in the military operations during the Polish uprising of 1830–1831, was placed in charge of the military operation on the Palatinate side of the Rhine River.

Brentano ordered the day-to-day affairs of the uprising in Baden, and Mieroslawski directed a military command on the Palatinate side. They did not coordinate well. For example, Mieroslawski decided to abolish the long-standing toll on the Mannheim-Ludwigshaven bridge over the Rhine River. It was not collected on the Palatinate side, but Brentano's government collected it on the Baden side. Due to the continued lack of coordination, Mieroslawski lost battles in Waghausle and Ubstadt in Baden. He and his troops were forced to retreat across the mountains of southern Baden, where they fought a last battle against the Prussians in the town of Murg, on the frontier between Baden and Switzerland. Mieroslawski and the other survivors of the battle escaped across the frontier to Switzerland, and the commander went into exile in Paris.

Frederick Engels took part in the uprising in Baden and the Palatinate. On 10 May 1848, he and Karl Marx traveled from Cologne, Germany, to observe the events of the region. From 1 June 1848, Engels and Marx became editors of the Neue Rheinische Zeitung. Less than a year later, on 19 May 1849, the Prussian authorities closed down the newspaper because of its support for constitutional reforms.

In late 1848, Marx and Engels intended to meet with Karl Ludwig Johann D'Ester, then serving as a member of the provisional government in Baden and the Palatinate. He was a physician, democrat and socialist who had been a member of the Cologne community chapter of the Communist League. D'Ester had been elected as a deputy to the Prussian National Assembly in 1848. D'Ester had been elected to the Central committee of the German Democrats, together with Reichenbach and Hexamer, at the Second Democratic Congress held in Berlin from 26 October through 30 October 1848. Because of his commitments to the provisional government, D'Ester was unable to attend an important meeting in Paris on behalf of the German Central Committee. He wanted to provide Marx with the mandate to attend the meeting in his place. Marx and Engels met with D'Ester in the town of Kaiserslautern. Marx obtained the mandate and headed off to Paris.

Engels remained in the Palatinate, where in 1849 he joined citizens at the barricades of Elberfeld in the Rhineland, preparing to fight the Prussian troops expected to attack the uprising. On his way to Elberfeld, Engels took two cases of rifle cartridges which had been gathered by the workers of Solingen, when those workers had stormed the arsenal at Gräfrath. The Prussian troops arrived and crushed the uprising in August 1849. Engels and some others escaped to Kaiserslautern. While in Kaiserslautern on 13 June 1849, Engels joined an 800-member group of workers being formed as a military corps by August Willich, a former Prussian military officer. He was also a member of the Communist League and supported revolutionary change in Germany. The newly formed Willich Corps combined with other revolutionary groups to form an army of about 30,000 strong; it fought to resist the highly trained Prussian troops. Engels fought with the Willich Corps for their entire campaign in the Palatinate.

The Prussians defeated this revolutionary army at the Battle of Rinnthal, and the survivors of Willich's Corps crossed over the frontier into the safety of Switzerland. Engels did not reach Switzerland until 25 July 1849. He sent word of his survival to Marx and friends and comrades in London, England. A refugee in Switzerland, Engels began to write about his experiences during the revolution. He published the article, "The Campaign for the German Imperial Constitution." Due to the Prussian Army's ease in crushing the uprising, many South German states came to believe that Prussia, not Austria, was going to be the new power in the region. The suppression of the uprising in Baden and the Palatinate was the end of the German revolutionary uprisings that had begun in the spring of 1848.

== Prussia ==
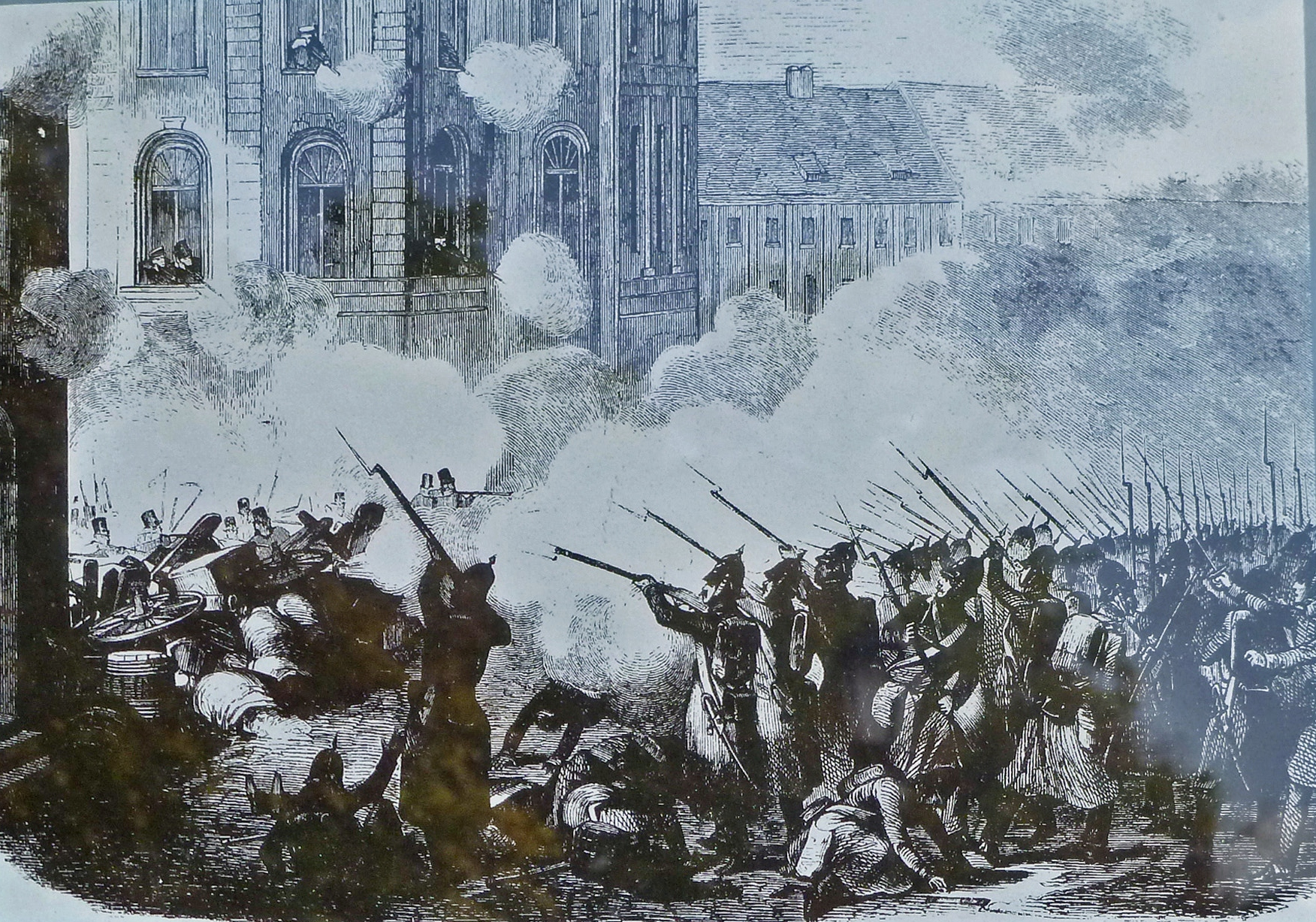
Barricades at Alexander Platz, Berlin

On 13 March, after warnings by the police against public demonstrations went unheeded, the army charged a group of people returning from a meeting in the Tiergarten, leaving one person dead and many injured. On 18 March, a large demonstration occurred. After two shots were fired, fearing that some of the 20,000 soldiers would be used against them, demonstrators erected barricades, and a battle ensued until troops were ordered 13 hours later to retreat, leaving hundreds dead. Afterwards, Frederick William attempted to reassure the public that he would proceed with reorganizing his government. The King also approved arming the citizens.

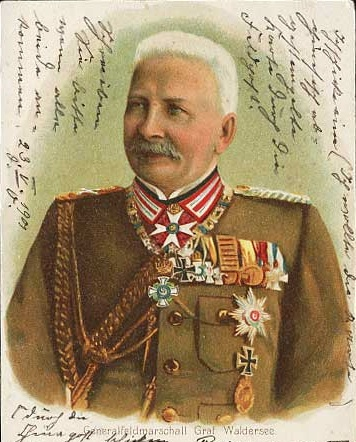
Alfred von Waldersee gave an account of the events of March 1848 in Berlin as seen by the soldiers.

In his memoirs, Field Marshal Alfred von Waldersee, who in March 1848 was a sixteen-year-old student at the Royal Prussian Cadet Corps, gave a vivid description of the revolutionary events in Berlin:

Those March days of 1848 left the most lasting impression on us young soldiers. From the so-called Spielhof alongside the Spree we could see the erection of the barricades on the Marschallbrücke. The outbreak began at different parts of the city at two o'clock in the afternoon of the 18th, our attention being called to it by the circumstance that shots were fired at the sentinels in front of the Franz Regiment's barracks, which adjoined those of the Cadet Corps. The report went that the Cadet Corps, that breeding place of reaction, was to be up rooted [sic]! This put our superior officers in a very awkward predicament; all connection with the outer world was cut off, and the Franz Regiment, which had been quartered next door to us, had been moved away, so we had to decide for ourselves what to do. General von Below was a feeble old man, Lieut.-Colonel Richter and our company commanders were all elderly—most of them had taken part in the War of Liberation—and some of them were no good as officers, so it was small wonder if a lack of vigour or decision was displayed. It was under debate whether we should not abstain from any attempt at resistance, when the senior lieutenant, Besserer von Dahlfingen, of my company, an exceptionally small man, spoke out at the Council of War and declared that it would be a disgrace if we surrendered to the Revolutionaries without a blow. Thereupon it was resolved to put up a fight. Our main position was to be on the first floor, led, up to by four stone staircases, each of which was allotted to a company. Our firearms, which had been placed in hiding already, were taken out again, and we began to block up the entrances to the staircases. Unfortunately we had no ammunition! This lack was in some degree made good by such officers as were sportsmen and had some powder and shot to distribute, so that firing might have been done by each of the companies; percussion-caps we secured from the Franz Regiment's barracks. However, things were not to become serious, for a battalion of the 1st Regiment of Guards pushed forward to the Marschallbrücke and averted all possibility of danger for us. The noise of the fighting died down now a little, only to revive again in the evening. The Leibregiment advanced to the Alexanderplatz from the Frankfurter Gate, amidst the same kind of continuous but unsystematic fighting which the Guards also had encountered.

Early in the morning of the 19th—it may have been about 4 o'clock, the shooting had been followed by silence throughout the city—we were given the alarm and had to don our cloaks and fall in with our guns and march to the Schloss (the Royal Palace in Berlin), by order of General von Prittwitz. We set out just as day was breaking. In the Königstrasse we passed three or four deserted barricades; we could see that most of the windows in the street were broken and that all the houses showed marks of bullets.

Arrived at the Schloss, led by General von Below, himself afoot, we were ushered through "Portal No. I" into the Castle Yard, where General von Prittwitz was to be seen mounted on a chestnut with some officers round about him. We had now to down arms and we began almost to freeze in the cold morning air. It was very pleasant for us, therefore, when we were taken, troop by troop, into the kitchen, and given coffee. There was now a lively va-et-vient of mounted aides-de-camp, and others in the Castle Yard. The streets through which we had passed, and the open places outside the Schloss, had, of course, been empty. Now we saw many waggons [sic] and bodies of troops bivouacking. Prisoners were being brought in every now and again and taken into the Castle cellars. After a wait of two hours or so we were given orders to march back to Potsdam.

On 21 March, crowds of people gathered in Berlin to present their demands in an "address to the king". King Frederick William IV, taken by surprise, verbally yielded to all the demonstrators' demands, including parliamentary elections, a constitution, and freedom of the press. He promised that "Prussia was to be merged forthwith into Germany."

The next day the King proceeded through the streets of Berlin to attend a mass funeral at the Friedrichshain cemetery for the civilian victims of the uprising. He and his ministers and generals wore the revolutionary tricolor of black, red, and gold. Polish prisoners, who had been jailed for planning a rebellion in formerly Polish territories now ruled by Prussia, were liberated and paraded through the city to the acclaim of the people. The 254 persons killed during the riots were laid out on catafalques on the Gendarmenmarkt. Some 40,000 people accompanied these fallen demonstrators to their burial place at Friedrichshain.

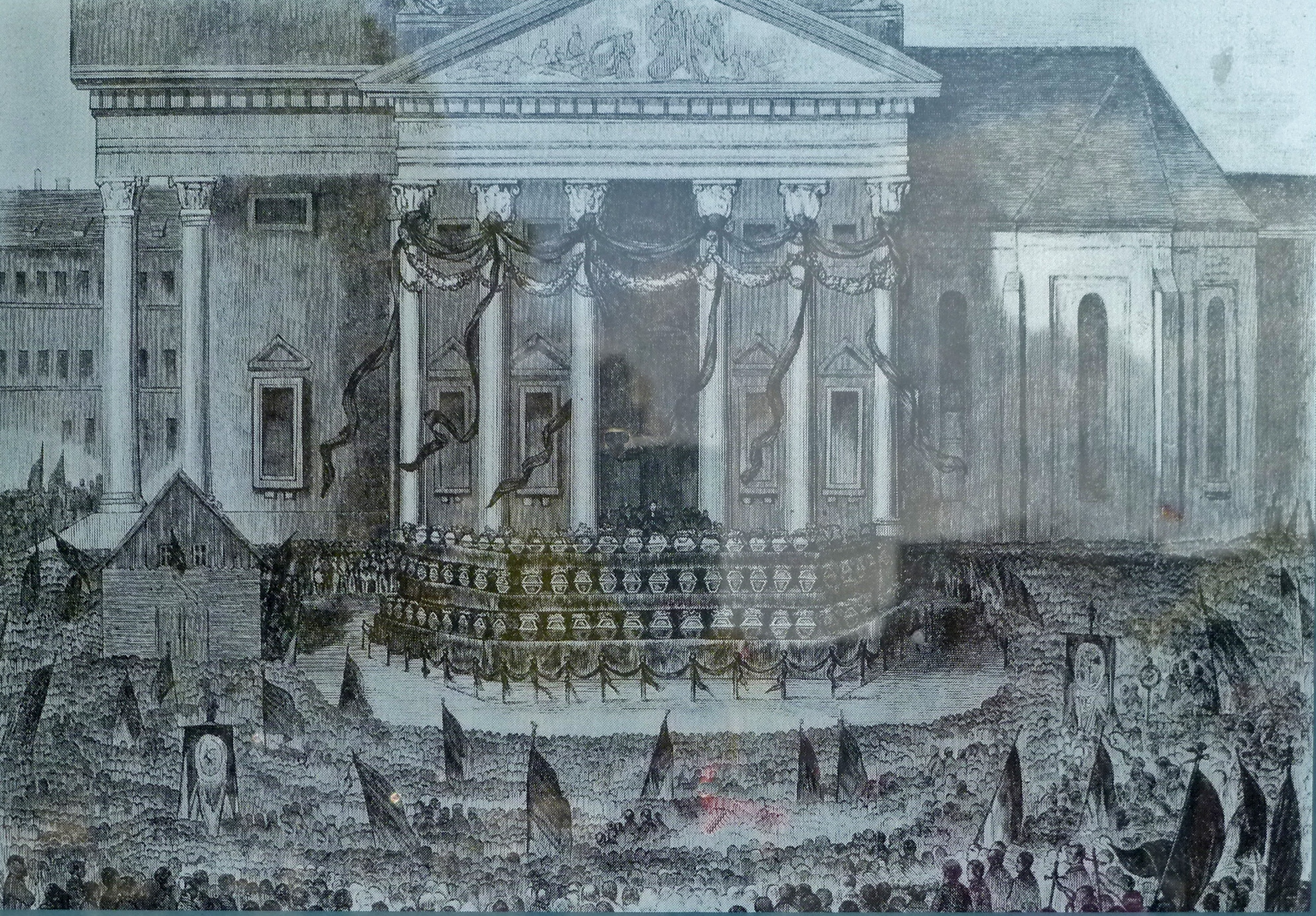
The dead are laid out on the Gendarmenmarkt, Berlin.

A Constituent National Assembly was elected from various German states in late April and early May 1848 and gathered in St. Paul's Church in Frankfurt am Main on 18 May 1848. The deputies consisted of 122 government officials, 95 judges, 81 lawyers, 103 teachers, 17 manufacturers and wholesale dealers, 15 physicians, and 40 landowners. A majority of the Assembly were liberals. It became known as the "professors' parliament", as many of its members were academics in addition to their other responsibilities. The one working-class member was Polish and, like colleagues from the Tyrol, not taken seriously.

Starting on 18 May 1848, the Frankfurt Assembly worked to find ways to unite the various German states and to write a constitution. The Assembly was unable to pass resolutions and dissolved into endless debate.

On 22 May 1848, another elected assembly sat for the first time in Berlin. They were elected under the law of 8 April 1848, which allowed for universal manhood suffrage and a two-stage voting system. Most of the deputies elected to the Prussian National Assembly were members of the burghers or liberal bureaucracy. They set about the task of writing a constitution "by agreement with the Crown", but on 9 November, before it had completed its work, the Assembly was adjourned and "for its own safety" moved to Brandenburg an der Havel.

== Saxony ==
The May uprising in Dresden

In Dresden, the capital of the Kingdom of Saxony, the people took to the streets asking King Frederick Augustus II of Saxony to engage in electoral reform, social justice and for a constitution.

German composer Richard Wagner passionately engaged himself in the revolution in Dresden, supporting the democratic-republican movement. Later during the May Uprising in Dresden from 3–9 May 1849, he supported the provisional government. Others participating in the Uprising were the Russian revolutionary Michael Bakunin and the German working-class leader Stephen Born. In all, about 2,500 combatants manned the barricades during the May Uprising. On 9 May 1849, together with the leaders of the uprising, Wagner left Dresden for Switzerland to avoid arrest. He spent a number of years in exile abroad, in Switzerland, Italy, and Paris. Finally the government lifted its ban against him and he returned to Germany.

Since the revolutionary events of 1830, Saxony had been ruled as a constitutional monarchy with a two-chamber legislature and an accountable ministry. This constitution continued to serve as the basis of the Saxon government until 1918. The Revolution of 1848 brought more popular reforms in the government of Saxony.

In 1849, many Saxon residents emigrated to the United States, including Michael Machemehl. They landed in Galveston, Texas, and created what became the German Texan community. In mid-century, some lived in cities, but many developed substantial farms to the west in Texas.

== The Rhineland or Rhenish Prussia ==
The Rhineland shared a common history with the Rhenish Hesse, Luxembourg and the Palatinate of having been under the control of Revolutionary and then Napoleonic France from 1795. His rule established social, administrative and legislative measures that broke up the feudal rule that the clergy and the nobility had exercised over the area previously. The soil of the Rhineland is not the best for agriculture, but forestry has traditionally been a strong industry there. The relative lack of agriculture, late 18th-century elimination of the feudal structure, and the strong logging industry contributed to the industrialization of the Rhineland. With nearby sources of coal in the Mark, and access via the Rhine to the North Sea, the west bank of the Rhine in the Rhineland became the premier industrial area in Germany in the 19th century. By 1848, the towns of Aachen, Cologne and Düsseldorf were heavily industrialized, with a number of different industries represented. At the beginning of the 19th century, more than 90% of the population of the Rhineland was engaged in agriculture (including lumbering), but by 1933, only 12% were still working in agriculture

By 1848, a large industrial working class, the proletariat, had developed and, owing to Napoleonic France, the level of education was relatively high and it was politically active. While in other German states the liberal petty bourgeoisie led the uprisings of 1848, in the Rhineland the proletariat was asserting its interests openly against the bourgeoisie as early as 1840.

In 1848, Prussia controlled the Rhineland as part of "Western Prussia", having first acquired territory in this area in 1614. During the Napoleonic Era, as noted above, the Rhineland west of the Rhine had been incorporated into France and its feudal structures dismantled. But, following the defeat of Napoleon in 1814, Prussia took over the west bank of the Rhineland. Its government treated the Rhinelanders as subjects and alien peoples, and it began to reinstate the hated feudal structures. Much of the revolutionary impulse in the Rhineland in 1848 was colored by a strong anti-Prussian feeling. The Rhinelanders took careful note of the announcement by King Frederick William IV on 18 March 1848, in Berlin that a United Diet would be formed and that other democratic reforms would be instituted. Elections for the United Diet were indirect. The elections were conducted on the basis of universal male suffrage, and they were to choose the members of the United Diet. Rhinelanders remained hopeful regarding this progress and did not participate in the early round of uprisings that were occurring in other parts of Germany.

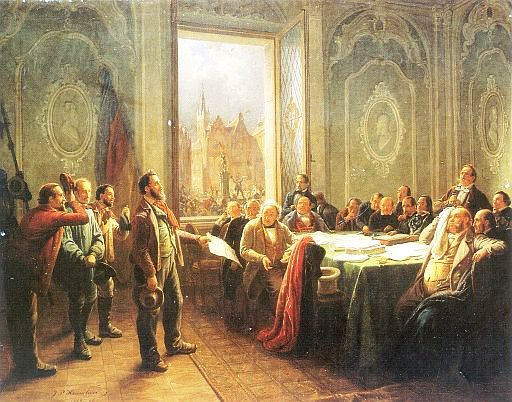
Arbeiterdelegation 1848 vor dem Magistrat by Johann Peter Hasenclever

The Prussian government mistook this quietude in the Rhineland for loyalty to the autocratic Prussian government. The Prussian government began offering military assistance to other states in suppressing the revolts in their territories and cities, i.e. Dresden, the Palatinate, Baden, Wűrttemberg, Franconia, etc. Soon the Prussians discovered that they needed additional troops in this effort. Taking the loyalty of the Rhineland for granted, in the spring of 1849 the Prussian government called up a large portion of the army reserve—the Landwehr in Westphalia and the Rhineland. This action was opposed: the order to call up the Landwehr affected all males under the age of 40 years, and such a call up was to be done only in time of war, not in peacetime, when it was considered illegal. The Prussian King dissolved the Second Chamber of the United Diet because on 27 March 1849 it passed an unpopular constitution. The entire citizenry of the Rhineland, including the petty bourgeoisie, the grand bourgeoisie and the proletariat, rose up to protect the political reforms which they believed were slipping away.

On 9 May 1849, uprisings occurred in the Rhenish towns of Elberfeld, Düsseldorf, Iserlohn and Solingen. The uprising in Düsseldorf was suppressed the following day on 10 May 1849. In the town of Elberfeld, the uprising showed strength and persistence, as 15,000 workers took to the streets and erected barricades; they confronted the Prussian troops sent to suppress the unrest and to collect a quota of Landwehr conscripts. In the end, the troops collected only about 40 conscripts from Elberfeld. A Committee of Public Safety was formed in the town, to organize the citizens in revolt. Members of the Committee included Karl Nickolaus Riotte, a democrat and a lawyer in Elberfeld; Ernst Hermann Höchster, another lawyer and democrat, elected as chairman of the Committee, and Alexis Heintzmann, a lawyer and a liberal who was also the public prosecutor in Elberfeld. Members of the Palatinate provisional government included Nikolaus Schmitt, serving as Minister of the Interior, and Theodor Ludwig Greiner. Karl Hecker, Franz Heinrich Zitz and Ludwig Blenker were among the other of the leaders of the Elberfeld uprising.

The members of the Committee for Public Safety could not agree on a common plan, let alone control the various groups taking part in the uprising. The awakened working classes were pursuing their goals with single-minded determination. Citizen-military forces (paramilitary) organized to support the uprising. Military leaders of these forces included August Willich and Feliks Trociński and Captain Christian Zinn. On 17 May through 18, 1849, a group of workers and democrats from Trier and neighboring townships stormed the arsenal at Prüm to obtain arms for the insurgents. Workers from Solingen stormed the arsenal at Gräfrath and obtained arms and cartridges for the insurgents. (As noted above under the heading on "The Palatinate") Frederick Engels was active in the uprising in Elberfeld from 11 May 1849 until the end of the revolt. On 10 May 1849, he was in Solingen and making his way toward Elberfeld. He obtained two cases of cartridges from the arsenal at Gräfrath and carried them to Elberfeld.

The upper bourgeoisie were frightened by the armed working classes taking to the streets. They began to separate themselves from the movement for constitutional reform and the Committee of Public Safety, describing the leaders as bloodthirsty terrorists. Leaders of the Committee, who were mostly petty bourgeoisie, were starting to vacillate. Rather than working to organize and direct the various factions of protests, they began to draw back from the revolutionary movement, especially the destruction of property. The Committee of Public Safety tried to calm the reformist movement and quell the demonstrations.

== Bavaria ==
In Bavaria, King Ludwig I lost prestige because of his open relationship with his favourite mistress Lola Montez, a dancer and actress unacceptable to the aristocracy and the Church. She tried to launch liberal reforms through a Protestant prime minister, which outraged the state's Catholic conservatives. On 9 February, conservatives came out onto the streets in protest. This 9 February 1848, demonstration was the first in that revolutionary year. It was an exception among the wave of liberal protests. The conservatives wanted to be rid of Lola Montez, and had no other political agenda. Liberal students took advantage of the Lola Montez affair to stress their demands for political change. All over Bavaria, students started demonstrating for constitutional reform, just as students were doing in other cities.

Ludwig tried to institute a few minor reforms but they proved insufficient to quell the storm of protests. On 16 March 1848, Ludwig I abdicated in favor of his eldest son Maximilian II. Ludwig complained that "I could not rule any longer, and I did not want to give up my powers. In order to not become a slave, I became a lord." Although some popular reforms were introduced, the government regained full control.

== Liechtenstein ==
Encouraged by similar uprisings the same year, demonstrations emerged which caused increased opposition against the absolute monarchy of Aloys II. The aim of the revolution was to improve the economic and political situation of ordinary citizens in Liechtenstein, primarily fuelled by the worsening economy in the country in the years prior. On 22 March 1848, the people's committee appointed a three-person committee to lead the Liechtenstein revolutionary movement, which included Peter Kaiser, Karl Schädler and Ludwig Grass. Together, they managed to maintain order in Liechtenstein and formed a constitutional council. Liechtenstein was a member of the National Assembly in Frankfurt until April 1849.

Following the revolution, a constitutional council was elected on 27 July 1848 in response to popular demand from the revolutionaries, of which Schädler was elected as its president. The primary task of the council was the creation the draft for a new Liechtenstein constitution, of which the work was done primarily by him and Michael Menzinger. The District Council was formed on 7 March 1849 with 24 elected representatives and acted as the first democratic representation in Liechtenstein, with Schädler was elected as District Administrator. However, after the failure of the German revolutions, Aloys II once again instated absolute power over Liechtenstein on 20 July 1852 and disbanded the district council.

== Greater Poland and Pomerelia ==
While technically neither Greater Poland nor Pomerelia were German states, the respective roughly corresponding territories of the Grand Duchy of Posen and West Prussia had been under Prussian control since the First and Second Partition of Poland in the late 18th century. The Greater Poland Uprising of 1848, also known as the Posen Uprising, was an unsuccessful military insurrection of Polish troops under Ludwik Mierosławski against the Prussian forces. It began on 20 March 1848, and resulted in Prussia demoting the Grand Duchy to an ordinary Province of Posen. Nevertheless, both Prussian-held Polish-speaking territories of Province of Posen and West Prussia were formally integrated into Germany only 17 years later, upon foundation of the North German Confederation in 1866.

== National Assembly in Frankfurt ==
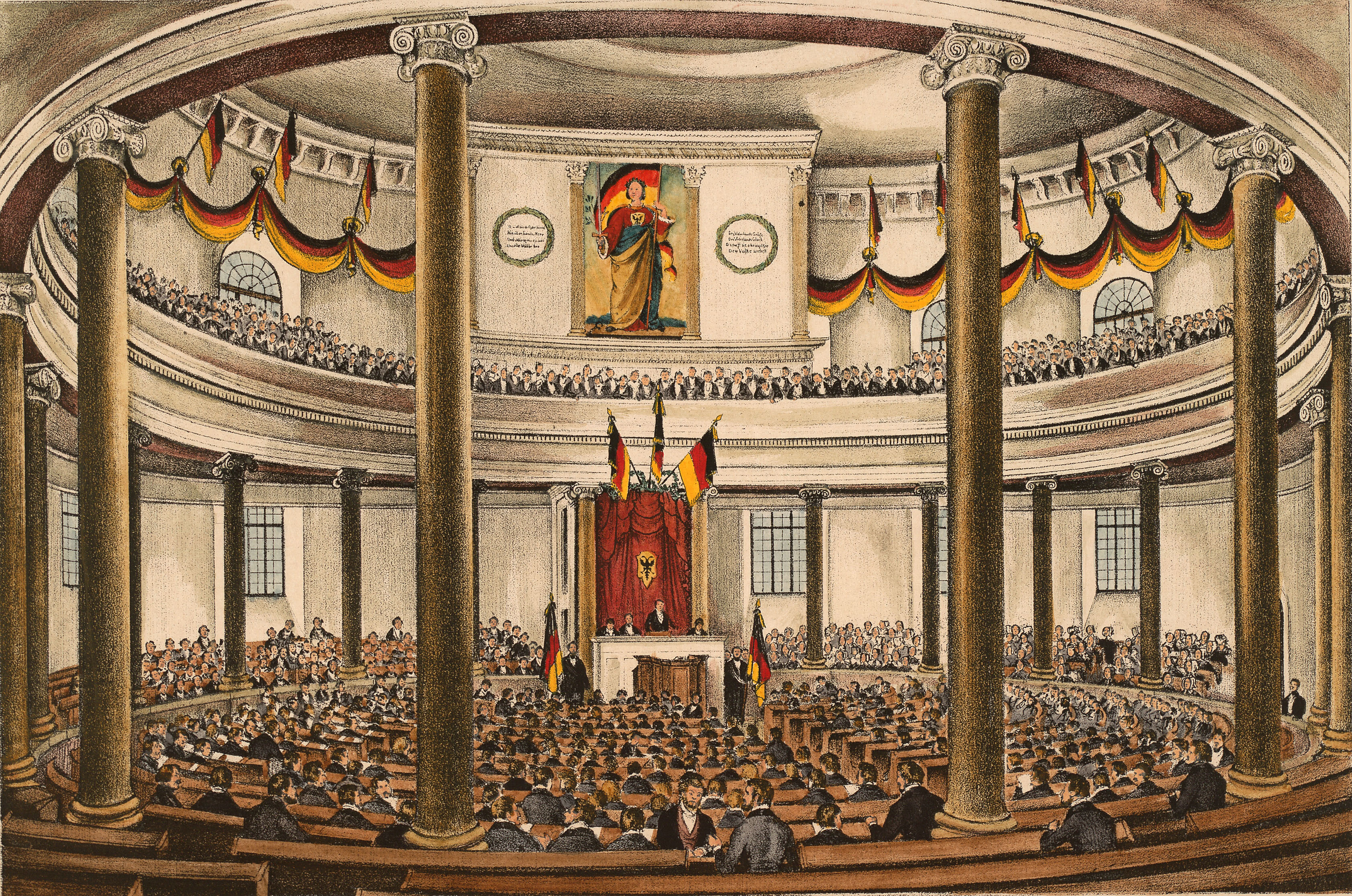
National assembly's meeting in St. Paul's Church

In Heidelberg, in the Grand Duchy of Baden, on 6 March 1848, a group of German liberals began to make plans for an election to a German national assembly. This provisional Parliament met on 31 March, in Frankfurt's St. Paul's Church. Its members called for free elections to an assembly for all of Germany – and the German states agreed.

Finally, on 18 May 1848, the National Assembly opened its session in St. Paul's Church. Of the 586 delegates of the first freely elected German parliament, so many were professors (94), teachers (30) or had a university education (233) that it was called a "professors' parliament" ("Professorenparlament").

There were few practical politicians. Some 400 delegates can be identified in terms of political factions – usually named after their meeting places:

- Café Milani – Right/Conservative (40)
- Casino – Right centre/Liberal-conservative (120)
- Landsberg – Centre/Liberal (40)
- Württemberger Hof – Left centre (100)
- Deutscher Hof – Left/Liberal democrats (60)
- Donnersberg – Far left/Democrats (40)

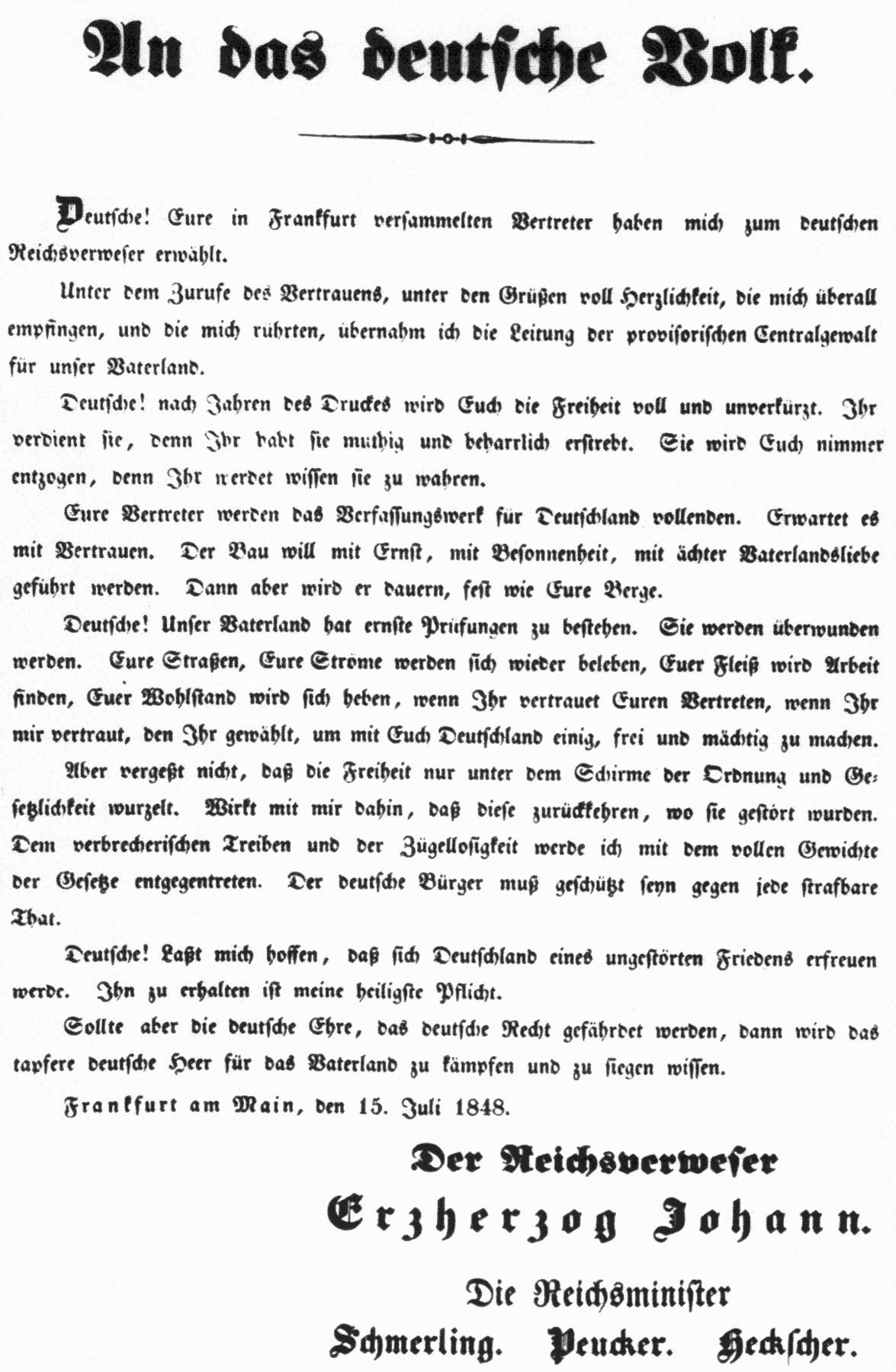
Archduke John's proclamation to the German people upon appointment as Administrator of the Realm

Under the chairmanship of the liberal politician Heinrich von Gagern, the assembly started on its ambitious plan to create a modern constitution as the foundation for a unified Germany.

From the beginning the main problems were regionalism, support of local issues over pan-German issues, and Austro-Prussian conflicts. Archduke John of Austria was chosen as a temporary head of state ("Reichsverweser"). This was an attempt to create a provisional executive power, but it did not get very far since most states failed to fully recognize the new government. The National Assembly lost reputation in the eyes of the German public when Prussia carried through its own political intentions in the Schleswig-Holstein Question without the prior consent of Parliament. A similar discrediting occurred when Austria suppressed a popular uprising in Vienna by military force.

Nonetheless, discussions on the future constitution had started. The main questions to be decided were:

- Should the new united Germany include the German-speaking areas of Austria and thus separate these territories constitutionally from the remaining areas of the Habsburg Empire ("greater German solution"), or should it exclude Austria, with leadership falling to Prussia ("smaller German solution")? Finally, this question was settled when the Austrian Chancellor introduced a centralised constitution for the entire Austrian Empire, thus delegates had to give up their hopes for a "Greater Germany".
- Should Germany become a hereditary monarchy, have an elected monarch, or even become a republic?
- Should it be a federation of relatively independent states or have a strong central government?

Soon events began to overtake discussions. Delegate Robert Blum had been sent to Vienna by his left-wing political colleagues on a fact-finding mission to see how Austria's government was rolling back liberal achievements by military force. Blum participated in the street fighting, was arrested and executed on 9 November, despite his claim to immunity from prosecution as a member of the National Assembly.

Although the achievements of the March Revolution were rolled back in many German states, the discussions in Frankfurt continued, increasingly losing touch with events.

In December 1848 the "Basic Rights for the German People" proclaimed equal rights for all citizens before the law. On 28 March 1849, the draft of the Paulskirchenverfassung constitution was finally passed. The new Germany was to be a constitutional monarchy, and the office of head of state ("Emperor of the Germans") was to be hereditary and held by the respective King of Prussia. The latter proposal was carried by a mere 290 votes in favour, with 248 abstentions. The constitution was recognized by 29 smaller states but not by Austria, Prussia, Bavaria, Hanover and Saxony.

== Backlash in Prussia ==
By late 1848, the Prussian aristocrats and generals had regained power in Berlin. They had not been defeated permanently during the incidents of March, but had only retreated temporarily. General von Wrangel led the troops who recaptured Berlin for the old powers, and King Frederick William IV of Prussia immediately rejoined the old forces. In November, the king dissolved the Prussian National Assembly and put forth a constitution of his own which was based upon the work of the Assembly yet maintained the ultimate authority of the king. Revised in 1850 and amended frequently in the following years, the constitution provided for an appointed upper house, the House of Lords, and a lower house, the House of Representatives, elected by universal manhood suffrage but under a three-class system of voting ("Dreiklassenwahlrecht"): representation was proportional to taxes paid, so that more than 80% of the electorate controlled only one-third of the seats. Otto von Bismarck was a member of the first Landtag elected under the new constitution.

On 2 April 1849, a delegation of the National Assembly met with King Frederick William IV in Berlin and offered him the crown of the Emperor under this new constitution. Frederick William told the delegation that he felt honoured but could only accept the crown with the consent of his peers, the other sovereign monarchs and free cities. But later, in a letter to a relative in England, he wrote that he felt deeply insulted by being offered a crown "from the gutter", "disgraced by the stink of revolution, defiled with dirt and mud".

Austria and Prussia withdrew their delegates from the Assembly, which was now little more than a debating club. The radical members were forced to go to Stuttgart, where they sat from 6–18 June as a rump parliament until it too was dispersed by Württemberg troops. Armed uprisings in support of the constitution, especially in Saxony, the Palatinate and Baden were short-lived, as the local militaries, aided by Prussian troops, crushed them quickly. Leaders and participants, if caught, were executed or sentenced to long prison terms.

The achievements of the revolutionaries of March 1848 were reversed in all of the German states and by 1851, the Basic Rights had also been abolished nearly everywhere. In the end, the revolution fizzled because of the divisions between the various factions in Frankfurt, the calculating caution of the liberals, the failure of the left to marshal popular support and the overwhelming superiority of the monarchist forces.

Many disappointed German patriots went to the United States, among them most notably Carl Schurz, Franz Sigel and Friedrich Hecker. Such emigrants became known as the Forty-Eighters.

== Failure of the revolution ==
The Revolution of 1848 failed in its attempt to unify the German-speaking states because the Frankfurt Assembly reflected the many different interests of the German ruling classes. Its members were unable to form coalitions and push for specific goals. The first conflict arose over the goals of the assembly. The moderate liberals wanted to draft a constitution to present to the monarchs, whereas the smaller group of radical members wanted the assembly to declare itself as a law-giving parliament. They were unable to overcome this fundamental division, and did not take any definitive action toward unification or the introduction of democratic rules. The assembly declined into debate. While the French revolution drew on an existing nation state, the democratic and liberal forces in Germany of 1848 were confronted with the need to build a nation state and a constitution at the same time, which overtaxed them.

When the Frankfurt Assembly opened on 18 May 1848, the deputies elected Heinrich von Gagern as the first President of the Assembly. He had strong support from the Center-Right Unionist party and some influence with moderates of the left, such that he could control perhaps 250 of the deputies of the Frankfurt Assembly. Gagern strongly supported unification of the German states. He insisted, however, that the Assembly needed to gain agreement of the monarchs, who were highly reactionary. In addition, only the Kingdom of Prussia had the military force necessary to effect this unification. Many in the Assembly, including Gagern, distrusted the intentions of the Prussian state and its absolutist government. Fearful of losing their positions as servants of the monarchs, the moderate liberals quickly concluded that only negotiations would lead to political progress. The Prussian army ignored the demands for reforms and chased the rump assembly out of Frankfurt in 1849.

The Frankfurt Assembly had no powers to raise taxes and relied completely on the goodwill of the monarchs. As many of the members held influential provincial positions, their reluctance to call for radical reforms or annoy their employers meant that they could not raise funds for armed forces, nor enforce laws they might pass. The hundred or so radicals, who believed that an armed uprising was necessary, lost interest and left the assembly to try to raise forces at a local level to bring about a 'real' revolution. Without a bureaucracy, they could not raise any money.

The Assembly members were highly motivated for reform, but the major divides among them became obvious and inhibited progress; for instance, advocates of Großdeutschland versus advocates of Kleindeutschland, Catholics versus Protestants, supporters of Austria versus supporters of Prussia. The major conflict that caused the collapse of the Assembly was the stand-off between demands of the moderates to write a democratic constitution and liberals' reliance on negotiation with reactionary monarchs to produce reforms. The various interest groups began to gather outside the Assembly to decide on their tactics.

Meanwhile, the rulers of the German states gradually realised that their positions were no longer under threat. The King of Bavaria had stepped down, but that was only partly the result of pressure from below. As the threat of an armed uprising receded, the monarchs realized unification would not be realized. They were unwilling to give up any power in its pursuit. As princes quelled rebellions in their territories, they followed the example of Prussia, recalling their elected deputies from the Assembly. Only Prussia, with its overwhelming military might, was able to protect the Frankfurt Assembly from military attack by the princes. But Prussia had its own interests in mind.

The Frankfurt National Assembly did agree to found the Reichsflotte, the German Navy, on 14 June 1848, which was significant to Germany's future power and reach.

The powerlessness of the Frankfurt Assembly, however, was reflected in the debate over the Danish Conflict of 1848. Like many other events of 1848, the Danish conflict was sparked by a street demonstration. On 21 March 1848, the people of Copenhagen protested in the streets to demand a liberal Constitution. The majority in the Duchy of Holstein and in the southern part of the Duchy of Schleswig were German-speaking. However, the Duke of both duchies was King Frederick VII of Denmark, the last absolute monarch of Denmark. The citizens of Kiel and Holstein were unsure of what was occurring in Copenhagen. They revolted to found a separate and autonomous province with closer relations with the German states. On 24 March 1848, they set up a new provisional, autonomous government in Holstein and raised a Schleswig-Holstein army of 7,000 soldiers. Unification opinion in the German states supported annexing the provinces of Schleswig and Holstein.

Prussia sent an army to support this independence movement, and ignored the Frankfurt National Assembly when Great Britain and Russia applied international pressure to end the war. The Prussians signed a peace at Malmö, requiring them to remove all Prussian troops from the two duchies and agree to all other Danish demands. The Armistice of Malmö was greeted with great consternation in Germany, and debated in the Assembly, but it was powerless to control Prussia. On 16 September 1848, the Frankfurt National Assembly approved of the Malmö Treaty by a majority vote. Public support for the National Assembly declined sharply following this vote, and the radical republicans publicly stated their opposition to the Assembly.

The Frankfurt National Assembly had been founded partly following the revolutionary events in Vienna, Austria, which resulted in the fall of Prince Metternich. Its strongest support came from the southern provinces, where there was a tradition of opposition to the local rulers. After Austria crushed the Revolutions of 1848 in the Italian states, the Habsburgs were ready to deal with the German states. Unable to muster an army and lacking broader support, the Assembly could not resist Austrian power. The Frankfurt National Assembly was dissolved on 31 May 1849.

== Peasant success of the revolution ==
Nationalism did not become the usual way of founding and legitimising states across Europe until after World War I. In the mid-19th century, over 90% of the population in the Austrian Empire and the German Confederation were peasants. Most of them suffered the indignity of serfdom or some lingering elements of the system of forced labor. Peasant revolts in 1848–1849 involved more participants than the national revolutions of the period. Most importantly, they were successful in bringing the final abolition of serfdom or its remnants across the German Confederation, the Austrian Empire and Prussia. The leader of the anti-serfdom peasant movement was Hans Kudlich, subsequently revered as Bauernbefreier ('liberator of peasants').

== In popular culture ==
- The second half of Max Ophüls' 1955 film Lola Montès lavishly depicts the famous courtesan's affair with Bavarian King Ludwig I, and his eventual downfall in the 1848 uprisings.

== See also ==
- Bourgeois revolution
- Revolutionary Spring: Fighting for a New World 1848–1849 by Christopher Clark
