= Sterling Records =

Sterling Records may refer to:

- Sterling Records (US), noted for being the first to sign Hank Williams
- Sterling Records (Sweden), a classical music record label
- Sterling Record Company, a British company set up by Russell Hunting that was a major producer of phonograph cylinders in that country.
