= Friedrich Balduin von Gagern =

German soldier

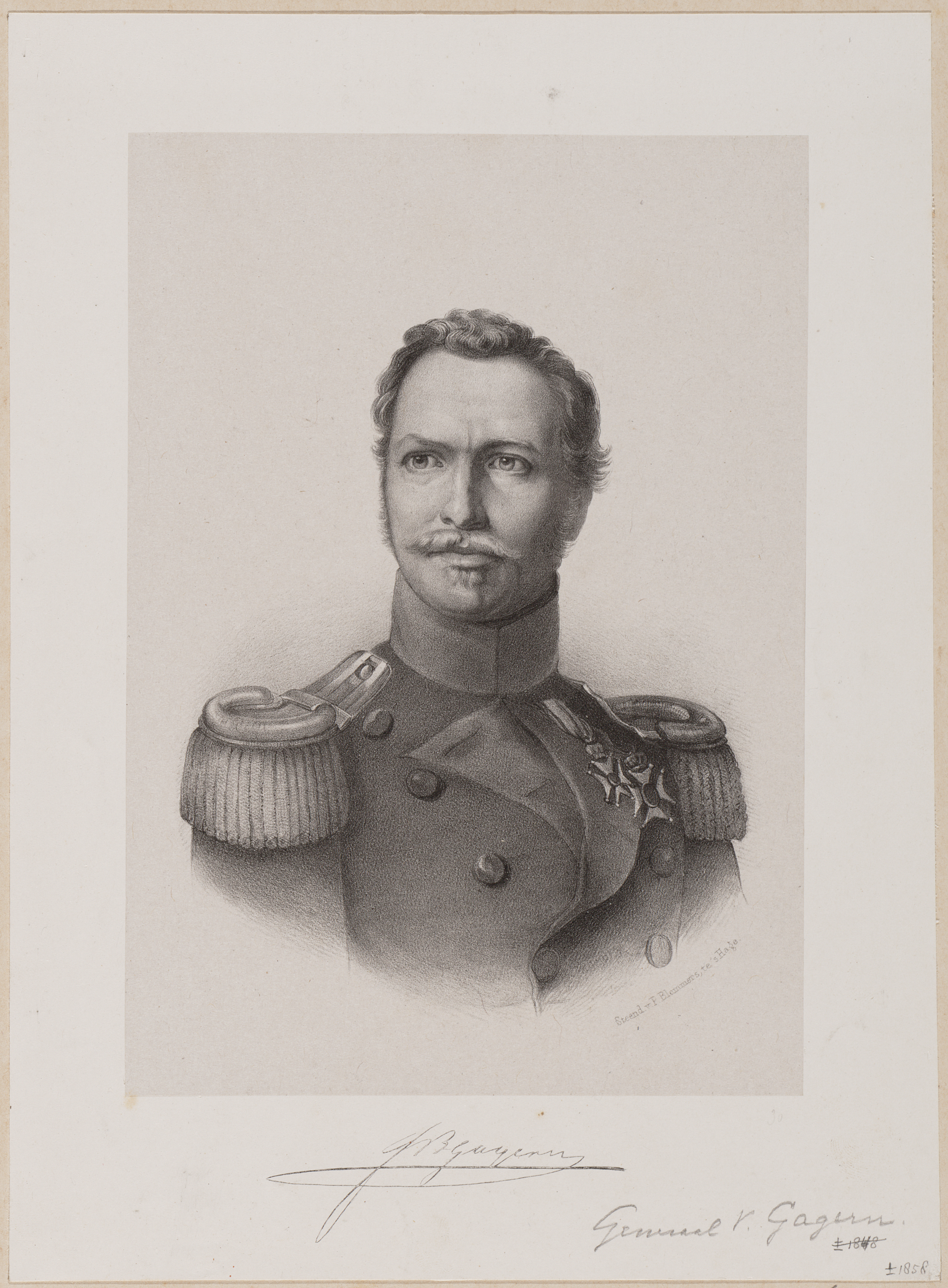
Portrait of Friedrich Balduin von Gagern

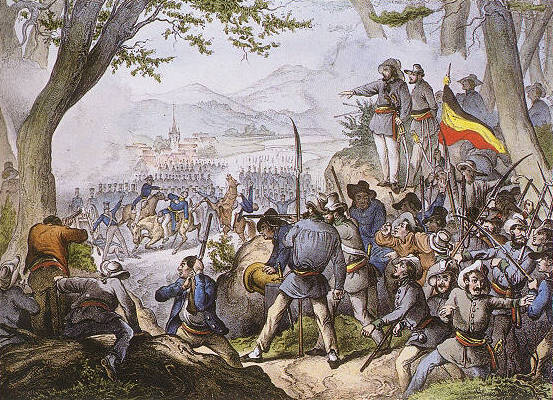
Death of Friedrich von Gagern in battle at Kandern

Friedrich Balduin, Baron von Gagern (1794–1848) was a German soldier.

== Life ==
He was the eldest of the sons of Hans Christoph Ernst von Gagern. He was born at Weilburg on 24 October 1794. He entered the University of Göttingen, but soon left, and, taking service in the Austrian army, took part in the Russian campaign of 1812, and fought in the following year at Dresden, Kulm and Leipzig. He then entered the Dutch service, took part in the campaigns of 1815, and, after studying another year at Heidelberg, was member for Luxembourg of the military commission of the German Federal Diet (1824, 1825).

In 1830 and 1831 he took part in the Dutch campaign in Belgium, and in 1844, after being promoted to the rank of general, was sent on an important mission to the Dutch East Indies to inquire into the state of their military defences. In 1847, he was appointed governor at The Hague, and commandant in South Holland.

In the spring of 1848 he was in Germany, and on the outbreak of the revolutionary troubles he accepted the invitation of the government of Baden to take the command against the insurgent "free companies" (Freischaaren) in the Hecker Uprising led by Friedrich Hecker. At Kandern, on 20 April, he made a vain effort to persuade the leaders to submit, and was about to order his troops to attack, when he was mortally wounded by the bullets of the insurgents.

== Sources ==
- Heinrich von Gagern: Friedrich von Gagern. Biografie, 1856/57 (his Life, in 3 vols. (Heidelberg and Leipzig, 1856–1857), was written by his brother Heinrich von Gagern)
- Julius Hartmann d. Jüngere (1878). "Gagern, Friedrich Freiherr von" . Allgemeine Deutsche Biographie (in German). Vol. 8. Leipzig: Duncker & Humblot. pp. 301–303.
- Paul Wentzke (1964). "Gagern, Friedrich Freiherr von". Neue Deutsche Biographie (in German). Vol. 6. Berlin: Duncker & Humblot. p. 29.
