= Hecker uprising =

1848 uprising in Baden, Germany

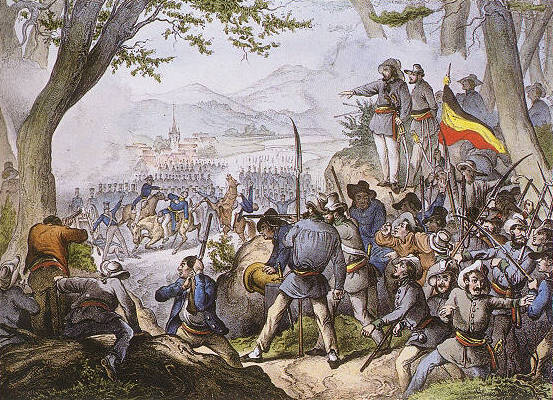
Death of General Friedrich von Gagern in the Battle at Kandern, which ended the Hecker Uprising. The print shows the battle from the perspective of the Revolutionaries.

The Hecker uprising was an attempt in April 1848 by Baden revolutionary leaders Friedrich Hecker, Gustav von Struve, and several other radical democrats to overthrow the Baden monarchy and establish a republic in the Grand Duchy of Baden. The uprising was the first major clash in the Baden Revolution and among the first in the March Revolution in Germany, part of the broader Revolutions of 1848 across Europe. The main action of the uprising consisted of an armed civilian militia under the leadership of Friedrich Hecker moving from Konstanz on the Swiss border in the direction of Karlsruhe, the ducal capital, with the intention of joining with another armed group under the leadership of revolutionary poet Georg Herwegh there to topple the government. The two groups were halted independently by the troops of the German Confederation before they could combine forces.

== Background ==
In the Grand Duchy of Baden, which already had a relatively liberal constitution enacted under the politically moderate Grand Duke Leopold, radical democratic ideas were widely held. The influence of the French Revolution of 1848, which had proclaimed the Second Republic several weeks before, was stronger in Baden than anywhere in Germany.

The uprising is named after its leader, the 37-year-old lawyer from Mannheim, Friedrich Hecker, who in 1848 was already the spokesman for the liberal-democratic opposition in the Second Chamber of the Baden Parliament.

Hecker, Herwegh, and Gustav Struve were well-known representatives of the Left in northern Baden. In the preparatory parliament of the March Revolution, however, they were in the minority with their radical, far-reaching anti-monarchical ideas. The majority of the bourgeois liberal representatives of the revolution, who mostly came from the upper-middle class, favored a constitutional monarchy under a hereditary emperor, in which liberal reforms would be possible.

Hecker and Struve had taken part in the Frankfurt preliminary parliament from March 31 to April 4, 1848, but in Frankfurt they had suffered both personal and political losses. Neither managed to be elected to the Fünfzigerausschuss, a committee of fifty chosen to bridge the period until the formation of a proper national parliament and their political ideas were not greeted positively. Disappointed, Hecker decided to advance the revolution in other ways, first in his native Baden.

== Preparation ==
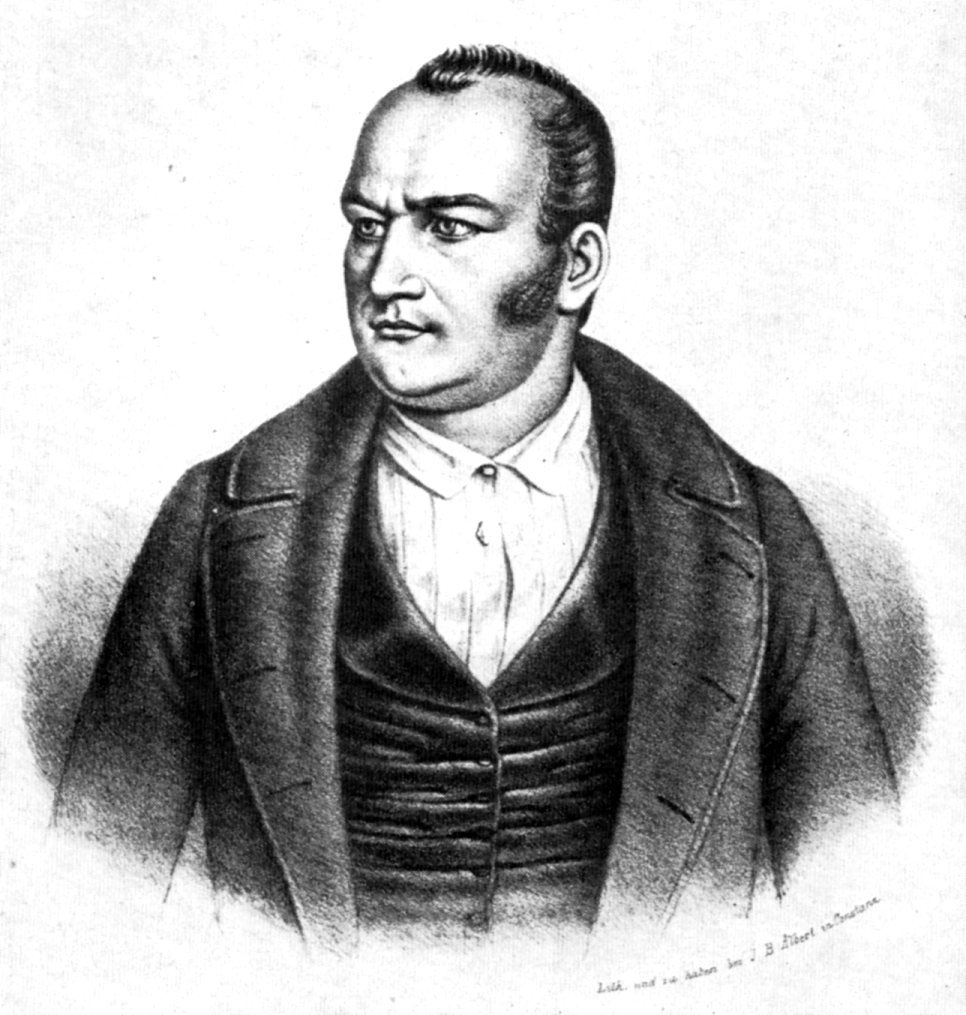
Joseph Fickler, radical democratic publisher

The city of Konstanz on the edge of Lake Constance seemed to Hecker a suitable starting point. The capital of the Lake Constance District was regarded as particularly receptive to liberal ideas and Hecker expected to find many supporters in the city and surrounding countryside. Several groups of liberal and republican-minded citizens had already emerged in Konstanz in the 1830s. Joseph Fickler had emerged as a local agitator in the Vormärz period before the failed March revolutions of 1848. He was the publisher and editor of the Seeblätter, a radical-democratic newspaper. Under Fickler's leadership a sports club was founded on March 31. With 40 charter members, the goal of the club was "to form an armed, but free corps" and shortly thereafter became a nationally-established liberal Workers Association. Fickler's arrest on April 8, 1848 gave Hecker the final impetus he needed to head to Konstanz.

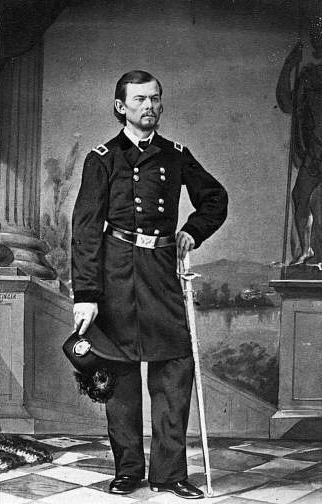
Franz Sigel, the leader of the Konstanz militia (pictured around 1861 as a Union officer in the US Civil War, following his emigration from Germany)

In fact, a somewhat republican but primarily militant mood prevailed in the spring of 1848 in the citizenry of Konstanz. Since March 5, 1848, there had been a permanent Citizens' Committee, convened at a public meeting, which was to represent the political citizenship at the pre-parliamentary assemblies in Offenburg. The situation in the city was tense. On the – as it turned out false – rumor that tens of thousands of armed and unarmed Frenchmen near Offenburg crossed the border to ravage the country, on March 26 a general arming of the citizenry took place. Franz Sigel, a former officer who was in the quasi-militarized city, organized a militia of 400 men on behalf of the mayor, Mayor Charles Hüetlin. The hopes of Hecker and Struve were based on the militia.

Hecker arrived in Konstanz on the evening of April 11. To escape arrest, he had traveled through France and Switzerland. Together with Franz Sigel, Gustav Struve, and Theodor Mogling, who had arrived earlier, he planned the next steps: Four columns were to march and meet up in Karlsruhe, one of Constance, two on different routes of Donaueschingen, and a fourth over upper Black Forest, from St. Blasien and Waldshut. They hoped for a snowball effect: the columns were supposed to gain more and more people en route so that the state should eventually collapse like a house of cards.

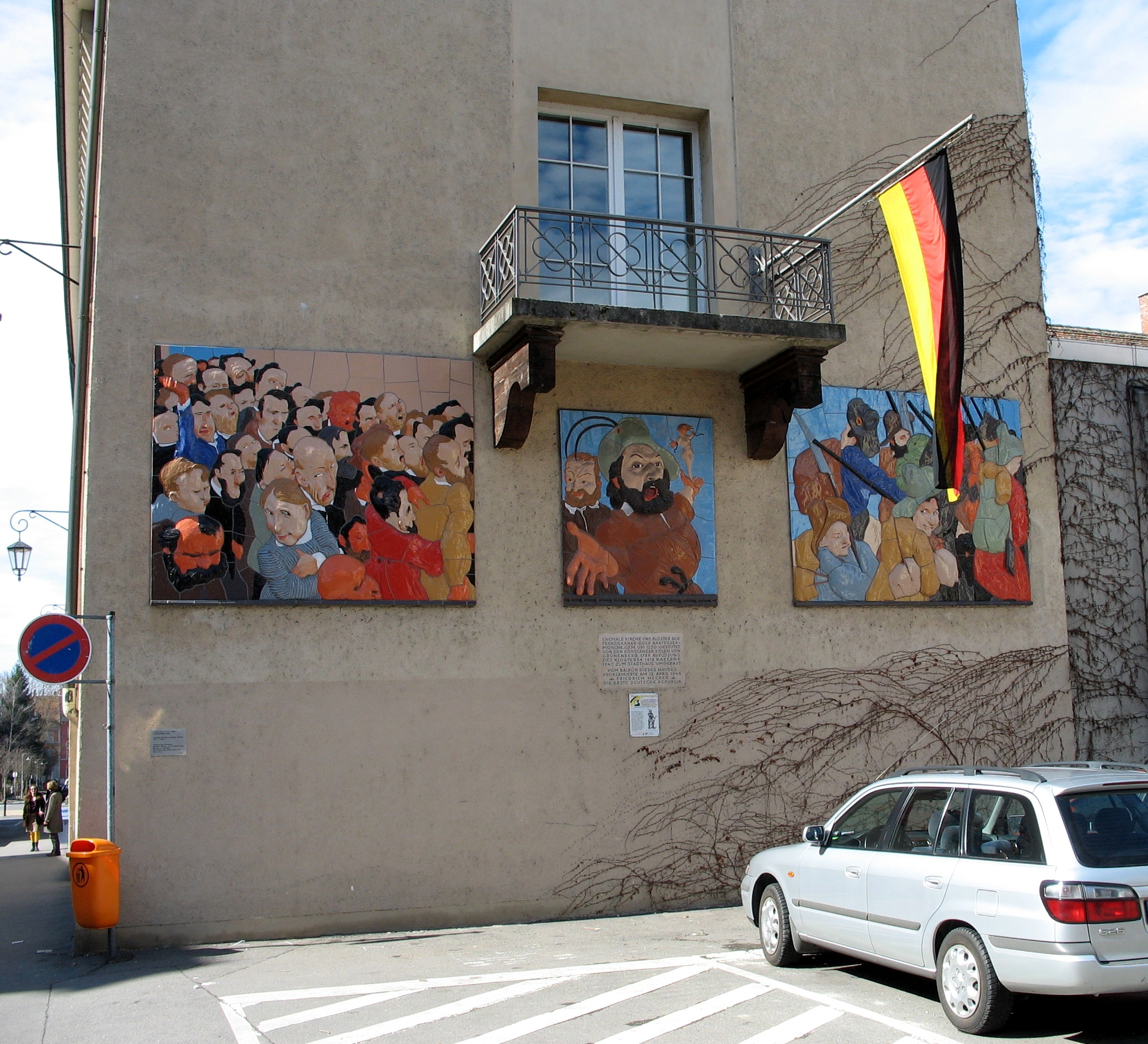
It was from this balcony on the Konstanz City Hall that Hecker supposedly declared the republic. The large maiolica reliefs were created by artist Johannes Grützke commemorating the Uprising.

The Konstanz Republicans, however, opposed Hecker's plan as unrealistic and dangerous. The troops of the German Confederation were said to be stationed all around and the operation was poorly prepared. They refused to support an armed uprising as the people had only armed themselves as protection against foreign enemies. Hecker pressed for a public meeting, he hoped to find the people more open to his plan. The People's Assembly was held on April 12 in the afternoon at about five o'clock in the Town Hall. There Hecker outlined his political stance and called on the people to participate in his plan. He and his companions did not find the expected enthusiastic reception. In the tumultuous atmosphere Hecker met with threats and hostility. Although he was speaking to a republican-minded majority, neither the Citizens' Committee, nor the People's Assembly, or the militia immediately wanted to join his Revolution.

Shortly thereafter the myth arose that Hecker, from the balcony of City Hall that evening and before an enthusiastic crowd, had declared the Republic. However, none of the three reporting newspapers, not even the leftist Seeblätter, mention such an event, and an actual proclamation almost certainly would have found expression in the local press. In the context of the events of that evening, it seems unlikely, moreover, that this was anything more than just a rumor. Nevertheless, this myth remained very stubborn, and was often used in post-revolutionary republican propaganda.

== The uprising ==
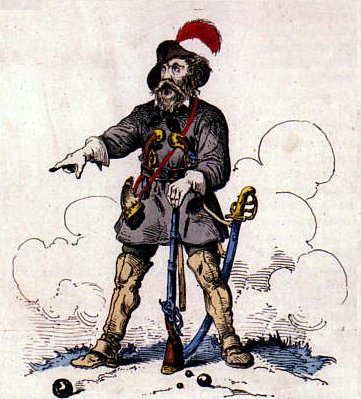
Friedrich Hecker, depicted in an anti-Hecker, contemporary caricature outfitted in the "revolutionary uniform" of a saber, musket, and the "Hecker hat" which became associated with the revolutionaries.

The goal of the uprising, which departed from Konstanz the day after the People's Assembly, was to advance towards the Rhine plain in order to meet there with another Republican volunteer army that was advancing from France, the 900-strong German Democratic Legion under the poet George Herwegh. Together, they wanted to occupy Karlsruhe the capital of Baden, dethrone the Grand Duke, and enforce a German Republic.

=== Beginnings ===
The first day of the uprising, Thursday, April 13, 1848, was a disaster. On the same evening that Hecker had encountered such strong opposition at the People's Assembly, Franz Sigel had assigned his militia to take part in the revolution. However, this was prevented by Mayor Karl Hüetlin. The following morning 150 men gathered in the market square, but with the rainy weather and the strategic futility of the venture apparent, only 30-50 men eventually joined. With Hecker, Sigel and Mogling they moved at around eight o'clock from the city - the number of curious spectators was probably significantly greater than that of the participants. Hecker, "Leader of the Insurrection and Supreme Commander," wearing his uniform of the revolution in which he appeared like a romantic robber chief: blue shirt, sword and pistol on his belt and the distinctive, wide-brimmed "Hecker hat".

The unified throng of the country people they had hoped for failed to appear. However, as they moved northwest, through Allensbach, Radolfzell, Stockach and Engen, volunteers from the isolated villages joined, so that the train grew slowly. In a few places such as Singen am Hohentwiel, the entire militia joined. Also in Konstanz some supporters finally surfaced. On the first day after the departure, April 14, a large crowd of Hecker supporters gathered to follow the main body. There was an armed confrontation outside the city chancellery, which almost degenerated into a small civil war. The supporters were encouraged by the (false) rumor circulating that thousands of farmers had joined Hecker. Eventually, on the 15th, between 150 and 250 volunteers with two artillery pieces behind them left Konstanz, reportedly accompanied by "jubilant crowds."

=== Makeup of Hecker's army ===
On the first day, between 30 and 50 men comprised the entirety of Hecker's fighting force. Around 120 to 250 more men from Konstanz followed on the second and third day. However, a week later, at the "Battle of Kandern", the force had grown to between 800 and 1200 men. Besides the men from Konstanz, most were from villages the column moved through or passed near. Many spontaneously decided to join - mostly small groups of citizens or sometimes a local militia. There were participants from Dettighofen, Stockach, Singen on Hohentwiel, Emmingen ab Egg, Liptingen, Immendingen, Freiburg, Möhringen, Grimmelshofen, Geisingen, Falkau, Gurtweil, Tiengen, and Utzenfeld. Even after the defeat of the uprising people continued to try to join, either from lack of information or to protest against the occupation of the country.

About 60 percent of the participants in the uprising were craftsmen (22.5% masters and 35% journeyman). Many of them were poor, many because their social situation had deteriorated, especially in the famine of 1846/47. Many journeymen could find no work and had little hope of being able to become masters themselves. Even master craftsmen often had virtually no way to make even a modest living. The remaining participants were manufacturers, as well as students from the University of Freiburg and farmers.

=== Defeat ===
Within days, the uprising was crushed. On April 14 military units of the German Confederation, under the command of General Friedrich von Gagern set themselves on the heels of Hecker's column. On the 16th, Hecker had to turn south towards Stühlingen and Bonndorf without having reached Donaueschingen, in order to avoid a clash with the Confederation troops. He was cut off from the lower Rhine; Mannheim, Heidelberg, and Karlsruhe were now unattainable. The army forced Hecker's column farther and farther to the southwest, until in Kandern, in the extreme southwest corner of the country, Hecker found himself forced to face them. The battle took place on the 20th. About 800 Hecker supporters faced around 2,000 soldiers from the governments of Hessen and Baden. The confederation troops were not only in the superior, but also better armed and trained. There were casualties on both sides. General von Gagern was among the first casualties of the battle, but the guerrillas were routed. Hecker and Struve were able to escape and fled to Switzerland.

== Aftermath ==
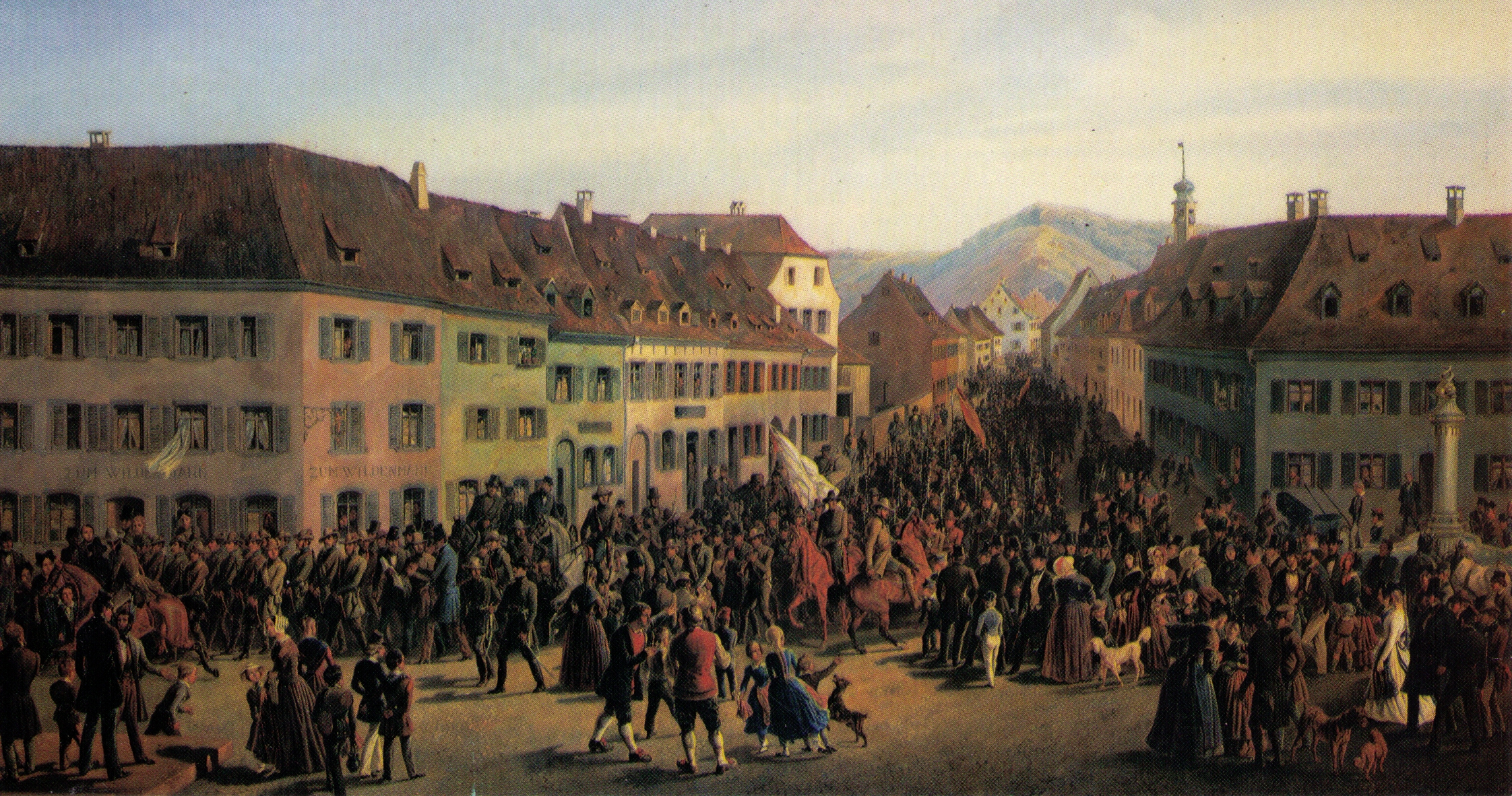
Entry of the militia into Lörrach under Struve's leadership in September 1848. (Oil painting by Friedrich Kaiser)

It took several days before the news of Hecker's defeat spread. Meanwhile, militia groups continued to set out to join the uprising. In Freiburg im Breisgau, although they had been informed of the defeat of the uprising, a public meeting on April 23 decided to take up arms against the approximately 3,000 soldiers who had arrived. The uprising was bloodily suppressed.

A week after the Battle of Kandern, on April 27, Herwegh's group was finally defeated at Dossenbach. His 650 men had only crossed the Rhine on April 23 - too late to come to Hecker's aid. On April 25, Bavarian soldiers arrived at Konstanz. The Lake Constance and the Upper Rhine Districts were in a state of war. A number of revolutionaries were arrested. The city remained under siege until March, 1849. With that, the first major republican revolutionary uprising in Baden failed. The rumor, Hecker was planning another uprising from Switzerland, persisted for months. Hecker, however, who could hardly still hope for a revolution in Baden, traveled through France and took up residence in the United States, only to return briefly in May 1849 as the revolution flared up again. Gustav von Struve remained in the area and tried in September 1848 in Lörrach to foment another uprising, which also failed. Georg Herwegh, who had also fled to Switzerland, took no more part in the Baden republican revolutions. Only Franz Sigel, the former military, participated in the May Uprisings and the Constitution Campaigns of 1849 and in the June 1849 was named Minister of War in the short-lived Republic of Baden, which ended with the capture of Rastatt by Prussian troops on July 23, 1849.

== Sources ==
- Marliese Hermann: Untersuchungen zur Revolution von 1848/49 in Konstanz. Magisterarbeit, Konstanz 1999
- Georg Heym: Die Revolution (Theaterstück)
- Gert Zang: Konstanz in der Großherzoglichen Zeit. Restauration, Revolution, Liberale Ära 1806 bis 1870. Konstanz: Stadler 1994. ISBN 3-7977-0301-5
