= Hans Huber (composer) =

Swiss composer (1852–1921)

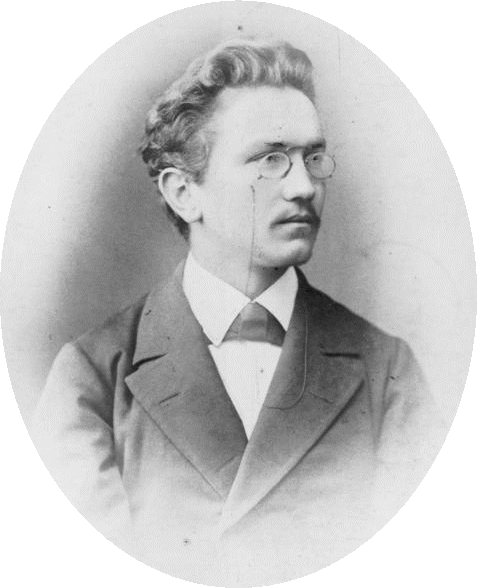
Hans Huber

Hans Huber (28 June 1852 – 25 December 1921) was a Swiss composer. Between 1894 and 1918, he composed five operas. He also wrote a set of 24 Preludes and Fugues, Op. 100, for piano four-hands in all major and minor keys.

== Biography ==
He was born in Eppenberg-Wöschnau (Canton of Solothurn). The son of an amateur musician, Huber became a chorister and showed an early talent for the piano. In 1870, he entered Leipzig Conservatory, where his teachers included Oscar Paul. In 1877, he returned to Basel to teach, but did not obtain a post in the Conservatory there until 1889; seven years later, he became director. Among his notable students were Hans Münch and Hermann Suter.

In 1889, Huber wrote an A major symphony, which was conducted in December 1889 by Friedrich Hegar, and whose full score survives. (Note: See the manuscript full score at Basel Library, together with information taken from Repertorium Schweizer Komponisten des 19. Jahrhunderts (ed. Arbeitsstelle Schweiz des RISM) (a source in preparation) and from Edgar Refardt's 1944 work Hans Huber. Leben und Werk eines Schweizer Musikers. There are four movements, Pastorale- Serenade- Idylle- Winzerfest, of this work, in A major, E major, C and A respectively (several RISM entries for this work, each representing a different source- full score, partial short score, etc.- have incipits for the four movements, not all of them the same ones- allowing some notion of what it would sound like if the score is performable and is taken up. From the incipits, one does see that the 1889 symphony is not an early draft of his published symphony in A major (op.134) as one might have thought a possibility.) He wrote in all nine symphonies, eight acknowledged, and several concertos, two for violin and four for piano. During his last years, he lived in Minusio in Villa Ginia. He died at Locarno.

== Works ==
Huber's first symphony, in D minor, subtitled "Tellsinfonie" has a slight programmatic element, derived from the story of the Swiss national hero William Tell. The symphony is somewhat similar in style and formal restraint to Brahms, although there is perhaps a foreshadowing of Sibelius in some of the orchestral textures.

Huber's piano concertos are slightly unusual for the form in that they have (with the exception of the 2nd concerto), like Brahms' second piano concerto in B♭ major, four movements (scherzos are included in addition to the usual fast, slow, and fast tempo movements). (Note: See the forum thread linked to below, however, so far as is known, only concertos 1 and 3 have come down to us intact of the piano concertos. There are also two violin concertos, one published during Huber's lifetime – his opus 40 in G minor, published 1879; another in manuscript, in D minor, based in part on one of his late violin sonatas (Appassionata)- indeed, one of its movements is an orchestration, with key changed, of the first movement of the first movement of that sonata (information on this is in the RISM database at RISM Online). The D minor violin concerto was published in 2013.)

=== Symphonies ===
- Symphony No. 1 in D minor "Tellsinfonie", Op. 63 (1880-1)
- Symphony in A major, without Opus (premiered 1889, conducted by Friedrich Hegar), then withdrawn)
- Symphony No. 2 in E minor, "Böcklin Symphony" "Sieh es lacht die Au'", Op. 115 (1897, premiered June 2, 1900, published 1901)
- Symphony No. 3 in C major "Heroic" for Soprano and orchestra, Op. 118. (1901, premièred 9 February 1902 in Basel, conducted by the composer, published c. 1908)
- Symphony No. 4 in A "Academic" in the manner of a Concerto Grosso (for 2 string orchestras, piano and organ) (c. 1907, premièred 15 December 1907 in Basel; dedicated to Felix Weingartner)
- Symphony No. 5 in F major "The Fiddler of Gmund" (also "Romantische". Dedicated to Henri Marteau.) (Premiered February 1906.)
- Symphony No. 6 in A major Op. 134 (dedicated to Fritz Steinbach) (premiered November 1911)
- Symphony No. 7 in D minor "Swiss" (1917, premièred 1917 in Basel, conducted by Hermann Suter, published 1922)
- Symphony No. 8 in F "Spring-symphony" (1920, premiered October 29, 1921 in Basel conducted by Hermann Suter)

=== Concertos ===
- Piano Concerto No. 1 in C minor, Op. 36 (1878; 4 movements)
- Violin Concerto No. 1 in G minor, Op. 40 (1879; 3 movements)
- Violin Concerto No. 2 in D minor, WoO (1886; 1 movement)
- Piano Concerto No. 2 in G major, Op. 107 (1891; 3 movements)
- Piano Concerto No. 3 in D major, Op. 113 (1899; 4 movements)
- Piano Concerto No. 4 in B♭ major (1911; 4 movements)

=== Other orchestral works ===
- Roman Carnival, WoO (1879)
- Eine Lustspiel-Ouvertüre, Op. 50 (1878)
- Symphonic Introduction to the opera Der Simplicius
- An das Vaterland (Symphonic Ode)
- Serenade No. 1, Op. 86, Summer Nights (1885)
- Serenade No. 2, WoO, Winter Nights (1895)

=== Operas ===
- Weltfrühling (Libretto by Rudolf Wackernagel, 1894)
- Kudrun (Opera in 3 acts, Libretto by Stephan Born, premiered January 29, 1896)
- Der Simplicius (Libretto by Albrecht Mendelssohn Bartholdy, 1899, 1912, 1915)
- Frutta di mare (Libretto by Fritz Karmin, 1913)
- Der gläserne Berg (unfinished, Libretto by Gian Bundi, 1915)
- Die schöne Belinda (Libretto by Gian Bundi, 1916)

=== Stage music ===
- Musik zu einem Festspiele (Text by Rudolf Wackernagel, 1892)
- Der Basler Bund 1501 (Text by Rudolf Wackernagel, 1901)
- Der Weihnachtsstern (Text by Meinrad Lienert, 1916)

=== Oratorios ===
- Der heilige Hain (1910)
- Weissagung und Erfüllung (1913)

=== Masses ===
- Missa festiva in E♭ (Kleine Einsiedler-Messe)
- Missa festiva in honorem Beatae Mariae Virginis D major (Grosse Einsiedler-Messe)
- Missa festiva in honorem Beatae Mariae Virginis F major (Male choir and organ)
- Missa in honorem Sancti Ursi
- Eine Fest-Messe

=== Cantatas ===
- Aussöhnung (Male choir, soloists and orchestra, 1879)
- Pandora (Mixed choir, soprano and orchestra, 1883)
- Caenis (Male choir, alto and orchestra, 1890)
- Heldenehren (Male choir, boys' or female choir, soprano, baritone and orchestra, 1909-1913)
- Kantate zum Jubiläum der Universität Basel (mixed choir, male choir, boys' choir, soloists, orchestra and organ, 1910)
- Meerfahrt (Ode for male choir, soloist and orchestra)

=== Other choral works ===
- 25 Male choirs a cappella
- Serbian and Romanian Folk Songs for mixed choir a capella

=== Chamber music ===
- Quintet for Piano and Winds, Op. 136 (1920)
- Sextet for Piano and Winds
- 9 violin sonatas
- 4 cello sonatas
- 4 piano trios
- 2 piano quartets
- 2 piano quintets
- Trio-Fantasia for Piano, Violin and Cello

== Recordings ==
The Swedish label Sterling has released all of Huber's symphonies (except for the 1889 A major symphony noted above), some tone poems, and two of the piano concertos (nos. 1 & 3). (Note: There have also been recordings of one of Huber's works for organ, and a recording on the Organ recordings label of Mainz, both in 2001; perhaps others. The score is again available at IMSLP, in a later edition under Clarence Dickinson, with the title 4 Psalm Fantasies.) There have also been several recent recordings from Huber's substantial output of chamber works, including at least one of his cello sonatas and three CDs (as of 2012) with violin sonatas of his; one of the early recordings of Huber's music was an LP of his first piano quartet "Waldlieder", with Hans-Heinz Schneeberger playing the violin.
