= Felix Raquilliet =

Polish military general (1778–1863)

Félix Raquilliet (1778–1863) became a staff general in the Polish insurgent army during the uprising of 1830–31.

Sources state that he was Polish and "emigrated to France," but Raquilliet is established as a French surname predating this emigration. In 1849 took part in the Baden-Palatinate uprising. For a while, he was acting as the commander-in-chief of the Palatinate forces.
