= Friedrich Hecker =

German-American lawyer, politician, revolutionary and army officer (1811–1881)

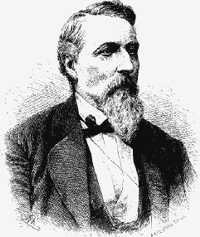
- Born: September 28, 1811; Eichtersheim, Grand Duchy of Baden
- Died: March 24, 1881 (aged 69); Summerfield, Illinois, United States
- Burial place: Summerfield Cemetery
- Military career
- Allegiance: United States; Union
- Branch: Union Army
- Service years: 1861–1865
- Rank: Colonel
- Commands: 24th Illinois Infantry Regiment; 82nd Illinois Infantry Regiment; 3rd Brigade, 3rd Division, XI Corps
- Conflicts: Hecker Uprising; American Civil War
- Other work: Lawyer, politician

Friedrich Karl Franz Hecker (September 28, 1811 – March 24, 1881) was a German lawyer, politician and revolutionary. He was one of the most popular speakers and agitators of the 1848 Revolution. After moving to the United States, he served as a brigade commander in the Union Army during the American Civil War.

== Education and politics ==
Born at Eichtersheim (now Angelbachtal in Baden-Württemberg), the son of a revenue official, he studied law at the University of Heidelberg with the intention of becoming a lawyer. In Heidelberg he became a member of the Corps Rhenania. In 1838, he was an advocate before the Supreme Court in Mannheim. He abandoned the legal profession on being elected to the Second Chamber of Baden in 1842, and at once began to take part in the opposition against the government, which assumed a more and more openly radical character. His talents as an agitator and his personal charm won him wide popularity and influence. His influence helped to oust the Blittersdorf ministry from office.

In early 1845 the political issue of the incorporation of Schleswig and Holstein with Denmark arose in the public eye, with a particular interest to democratically minded politicians who favored unity of all the German states as a core of their programme. On February 6 he gave a speech opposing this annexation in the Baden Second Chamber, which gave him much notoriety outside Baden. On March 9 his friend and liberal compatriot Adolf Sander died suddenly of a lung disease, marking the beginning an ever increasing tone of bitterness by Hecker toward the government. Later that year he and Johann Adam von Itzstein conducted a campaign of democracy, one result of which was his expulsion from Prussia on the occasion of a journey to Stettin, which had the effect of adding to his popularity. During this time, even before the outbreak of the revolution, he also began to lean towards socialism.

== 1848–49 revolutions ==
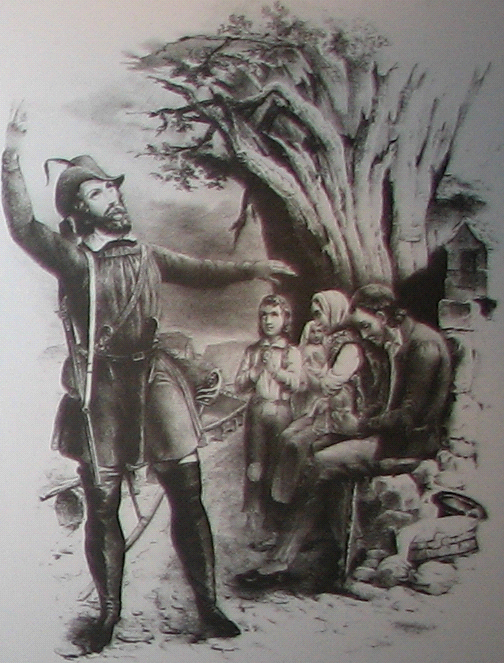
Glorification of Friedrich Hecker

In 1847 he was temporarily occupied with ideas of emigration, and with this object made a journey to Algiers, but returned to Baden and resumed his former position as the radical champion of popular rights, later becoming president of the Volksverein, where he was destined to fall still further under the influence of the agitator Gustav von Struve. In conjunction with Struve he drew up the radical programme carried at the great Liberal meeting held at Offenburg on September 12, 1847 (entitled Thirteen Claims put forward by the People of Baden). In addition to the Offenburg programme, the Sturm petition of March 1, 1848, attempted to gain from the government the most far-reaching concessions. But it was in vain that on becoming a deputy Hecker endeavoured to carry out its provisions. He had to yield to the more moderate majority, but on this account was driven still further towards the Left. The proof lies in the new Offenburg demands of March 19, and in the resolution moved by Hecker in the preliminary Frankfurt Parliament that Germany should be declared a republic. But neither in Baden nor Frankfurt did he at any time gain his point.

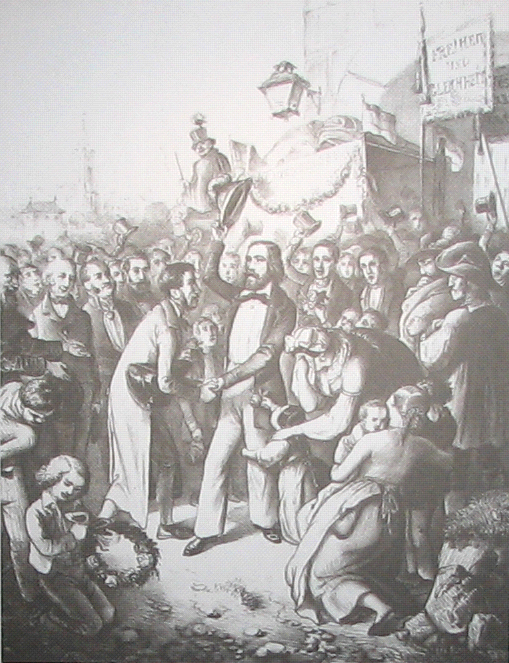
Friedrich Hecker leaving Germany at Strassburg

This double failure, combined with various energetic measures of the government, which were indirectly aimed at him (e.g. the arrest of the editor of the Constanzer Seeblatt, a friend of Hecker's, in Karlsruhe station on April 8), inspired Hecker with the idea of an armed rising for the foundation of the German republic. The 9th to 11 April were secretly spent in preliminaries of what would be known as the Hecker Uprising. On April 12, Hecker and Struve sent a proclamation to the inhabitants of the Seekreis and of the Black Forest to summon the people who could bear arms to Donaueschingen at mid-day on the 14th, with arms, ammunition and provisions for six days. They expected 70,000 men, but only a few thousand appeared.

The grand-ducal government of the Seekreis was dissolved, and Hecker gradually gained reinforcements. But friendly advisers also joined him, pointing out the risks of his undertaking. Hecker disagreed with them. The troops of Baden and Hesse marched against him, under the command of General Friedrich von Gagern, and on April 20 they met near Kandern, where, although Gagern was killed, Hecker was defeated.

He fled into the Canton of Basel, where he published a radical newspaper, and wrote his work "Die Volkserhebung in Baden" ("The popular uprising in Baden"). He was again elected to the chamber of Baden, but the government refused its ratification and would no longer respect his immunity as a deputy. On being refused admission to the Frankfurt Parliament, though twice elected to represent Thiengen, Hecker resolved in September 1848 to emigrate to North America like many other Forty-Eighters and bought a farm near Belleville, Illinois.

== American experience and the Civil War ==
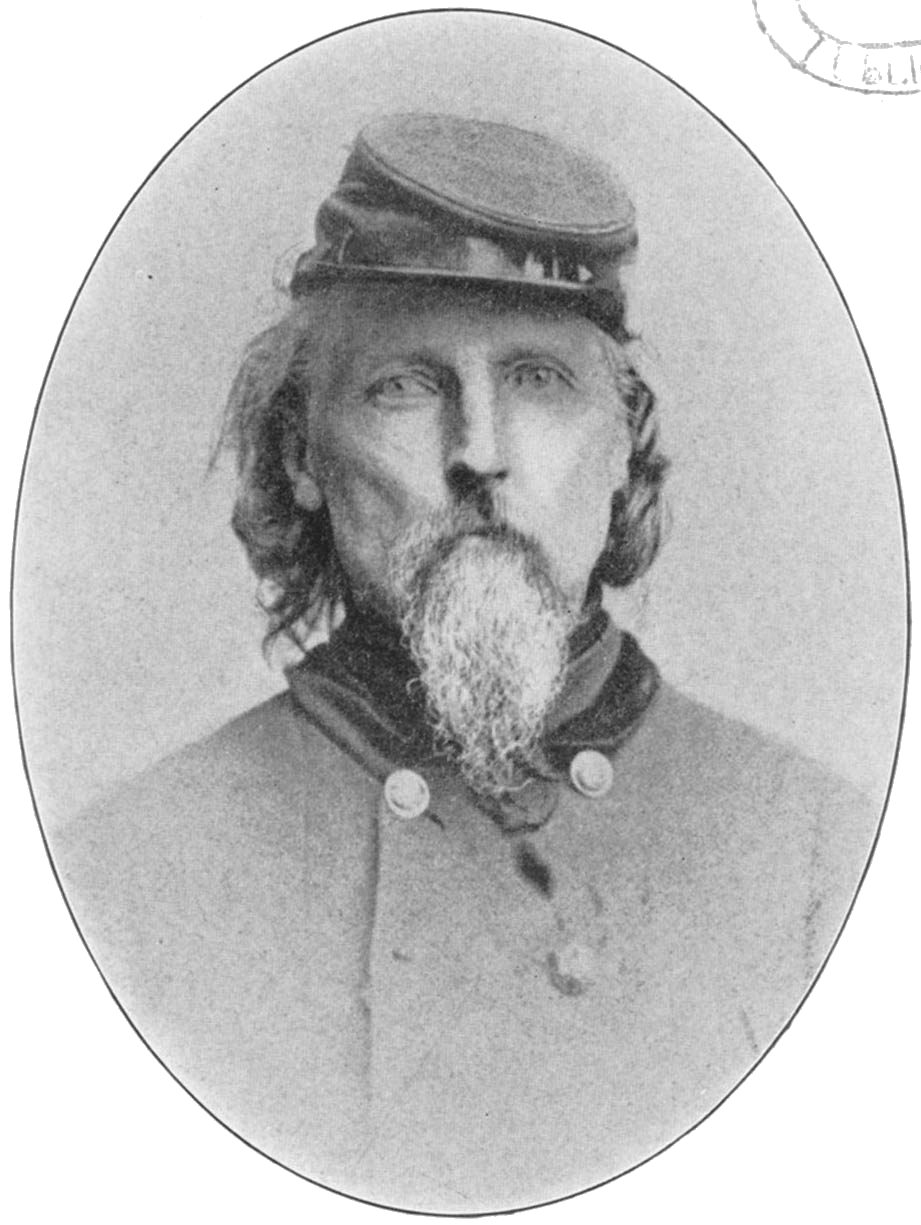
Colonel Hecker during the American Civil War

After moving to the United States, Hecker always maintained an acute interest in events in Germany. In the spring of 1849, the Baden revolution re-ignited, and Hecker returned to Europe to participate. However, he only made it as far as Strassburg when word came that the insurrection had been defeated by the Prussian Army and he returned to Illinois. In 1851 he wrote a foreword to the German translation of Thomas Paine's The Rights of Man which was published in Leipzig in 1851.

However, like most Forty-Eighters, his attention became increasingly focused on domestic political issues in the United States, and in particular the issue of abolishing slavery. When the Illinois Republican Party was organized at a convention in 1856, German-American Forty-Eighters were everywhere conspicuous in the proceedings; Hecker and Abraham Lincoln were selected to be the two electors-at-large if John Frémont were to win the state (which he did not). The Republicans attracted a wide array of political perspectives, with often strongly divergent views except for their opposition to slavery, and the interests of the immigrant Forty-Eighters was in sharp conflict with those of the nativist Know Nothings. The influence of Hecker and the other German-American leaders was critical in keeping the party unified in regard to its most important principles.

After the Battle of Fort Sumter, Lincoln called for 75,000 volunteers from among the state militia. The Illinois allotment of 6,000 volunteers was exceeded in five days. By June, ten regiments had been accepted, one of which was the 24th Illinois Infantry Regiment, commanded by now Colonel Hecker. The 24th Illinois was the first unit mobilized from Chicago, and was made up of German, Hungarian, Czech and Slovak immigrants, mostly Forty-Eighters. In the early days of the war, the 24th Illinois primarily was assigned to garrison and other rear echelon duties in the western theaters. Under the conditions of dreary guard duty, and not being professional soldiers, morale and discipline faltered, and Hecker resigned his command on December 23, 1861. The 24th continued on, still under the informal name of "Hecker's Old Regiment," and saw action throughout the western theater, including at Chickamauga.

In October 1862, he became colonel of the 82nd Illinois Infantry Regiment. Approximately two-thirds of its members were German immigrants and most of the other third was composed of immigrants from various countries. Company C was entirely made up of European Jews, and Company I was all Scandinavians. The unit served in the eastern campaigns, and Hecker was badly wounded at Chancellorsville on May 2, 1863. After recovering from his wounds, he later served at the Battle of Missionary Ridge and in the capturing of Chattanooga and Knoxville. Hecker resigned this command on March 21, 1864, but like the 24th Illinois, "Hecker's Second Regiment" continued on active duty for the remainder of the war.

When Hecker returned home, almost immediately he became involved in a political split in the Republican Party. Dissatisfaction among radical republicans with Lincoln's middle political road came to a head in May 1864 when Hecker led a faction of Frémont supporters to oppose Lincoln's renomination. The Lincoln faction won, and Hecker and others organized an independent convention in Cleveland to nominate Frémont (Frémont ultimately withdrew). The effect, in the end, was to strengthen Lincoln's candidacy among mainstream Republicans.

== Post-war activities and reputation ==
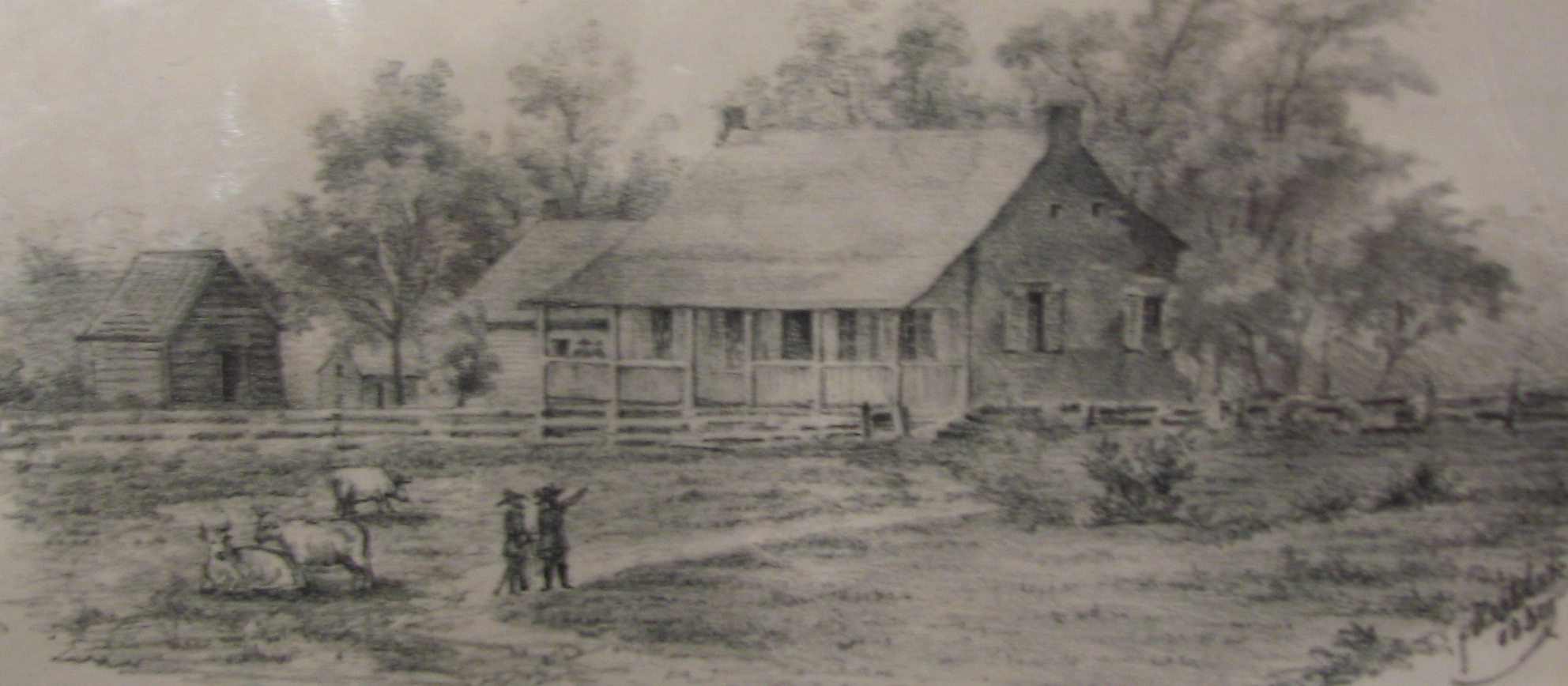
Friedrich Hecker's Farm in Summerfield, Illinois

After the war, Hecker returned to his farm in Illinois. It was with great joy that he heard of the union of Germany brought about by the victory over France in 1870-71. It was then that he gave his famous address at St. Louis, in which he gave animated expression to the enthusiasm of the German Americans for their newly united fatherland. After the war, he became more and more involved in the German-language press and Republican Party activities. He received a less favourable impression when he visited Germany in 1873 for criticizing lack of individual rights and the size of government in the new German government organization. He died at his farm in Summerfield, Illinois on March 24, 1881.

Hecker was regarded favorably among German democrats. A song known as the “Heckerlied” and a style of hat associated with him—a broad slouch hat with a feather—became symbolic of middle-class political activism during the period. After emigrating to the United States, he was also held in esteem for both his political activities and his personal reputation.

On October 1, 1882, the Friedrich Hecker Monument was installed in Benton Park, in St. Louis, Missouri. More than 15,000 people reportedly attended. The monument is a tall obelisk in the southeastern section of the park.

== Descendants ==
Among Hecker's male-line descendants are:

- Colonel Bill Hecker, U.S. Army veteran of the Vietnam War
- Major William Frederick Hecker III (1968 – 2006), former English instructor at West Point, scholar of Edgar Allan Poe's military career, killed in the Iraq War in 2006
- Lansing G. Hecker (1949 – 2026), former U.S. naval officer (1971 – 1977), German Honorary Consul with jurisdiction in Missouri and Illinois (2004 – 2016), advertising business owner in St. Louis, Missouri
- Edward N. Hecker, U.S. Navy veteran, retired entrepreneur, lives in St. Louis, Missouri
- George S. Hecker (deceased), World War II veteran, distinguished lawyer in St. Louis, Missouri, father of Edward N. Hecker

== Works ==
Selected published works:

- Die Erhebung des Volkes in Baden für die deutsche Republik. Basel, 1848 (Reprint edition: Köln: ISP-Verlag, 1997 ISBN 3-929008-94-7)
- Deutschland und Dänemark: Für das deutsche Volk. Schaffhausen, 1847
- Reden und Vorlesungen. St Louis [and] Neerstadt a. d. Haardt, 1872
- Aus den Reden & Vorlesungen von Friedrich Hecker / ausgewählt und mit einem Nachwort von Helmut Bender. Waldkirch: Waldkircher Verl.-Ges., 1985 ISBN 3-87885-119-7 (Badische Reihe; 15)
- Gepfefferte Briefe. Mannheim: I. Schneider, 1868

== See also ==
- Forty-Eighters
- German Americans in the American Civil War
- Hecker Pass, named after a nephew of Hecker
- Hecker uprising
