= 82nd Illinois Infantry Regiment =

82nd Regiment Illinois Volunteer Infantry "2nd Hecker Regt"
- Illinois state flag
- Active: October 23, 1862, to June 16, 1865
- Country: United States
- Allegiance: Union
- Branch: Infantry
- Engagements: American Civil War Battle of Chancellorsville; Battle of Gettysburg; Battle of Wauhatchie; Battle of Missionary Ridge; Battle of Resaca; March to the Sea; Battle of Bentonville

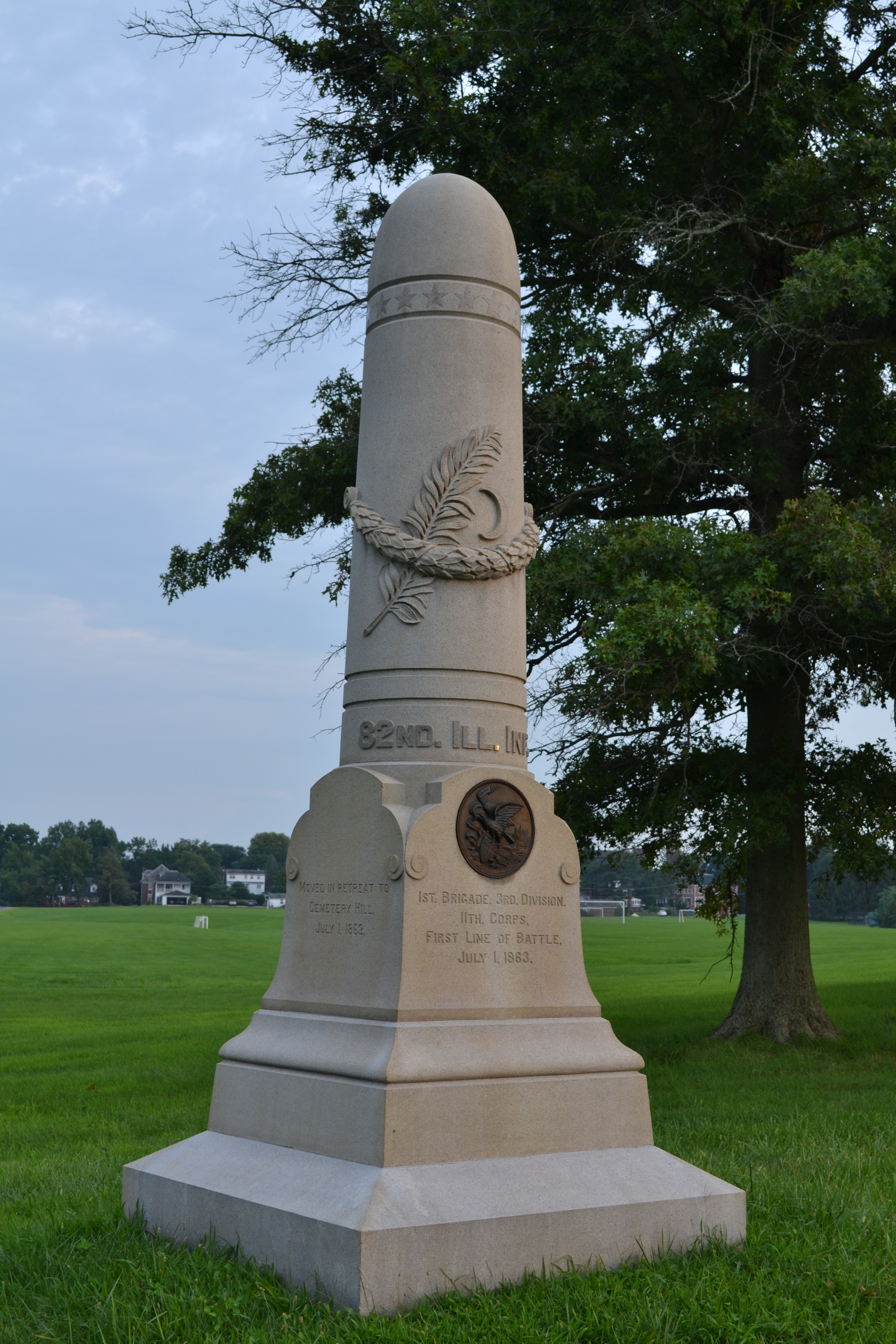
Monument commemorating the first line of battle for the 82nd Regiment Illinois Volunteer Infantry at Gettysburg National Park

The 82nd Regiment Illinois Volunteer Infantry, known as the "2nd Hecker Regiment," was an infantry regiment that served in the Union Army during the American Civil War. It was one of the three "German" regiments furnished to the Union by Illinois. Approximately two-thirds of its members were German immigrants and most of the other third was composed of immigrants from various countries. Company C was almost entirely Jewish, and Company I all Scandinavians.

== Service ==
The 82nd Illinois Infantry was organized at Springfield, Illinois and mustered into Federal service on October 23, 1862, Colonel Friedrich Hecker commanding. Attached to the XI Corps of the Army of the Potomac, it lost 155 men at Chancellorsville, including Colonel Hecker, who was badly wounded. Although just 23 men were battlefield casualties at Gettysburg, 89 were captured during the retreat through the town.

In the fall of 1863, it moved with the rest of the XI Corps to the Western Theater. Colonel Hecker had recovered from his wounds by now and was promoted to brigade command (he would ultimately resign the following winter). After seeing action at Chattanooga, the 82nd Illinois became part of the new XX Corps and joined the rest of Sherman's army in the 1864-65 campaigns in Georgia and the Carolinas.

The regiment was mustered out on June 16, 1865.

== Total strength and casualties ==
The regiment suffered 4 officers and 98 enlisted men who were killed in action or who died of their wounds and 60 enlisted men who died of disease, for a total of 162 fatalities.

== Commanders ==
- Colonel Friedrich Hecker - resigned March 21, 1864.
- Lieutenant Colonel Edward Selig Salomon - Mustered out with the regiment.
- Captain Emil Frey - taken prisoner at the battle of Gettysburg on 1 July 1863 and held in Libby Prison for eighteen months before being exchanged for Captain Gordon.
- Captain Anton Bruhn - commanded Company A and was previously 1st Lieutenant of Kowald’s Independent Company of Illinois Infantry (3 Months), Veteran of Hecker Uprising.

== See also ==
- 24th Illinois Volunteer Infantry Regiment
- List of Illinois Civil War Units
- Illinois in the American Civil War
