= Friedrich Strasser =

Friedrich Strasser was born in Austria. He became a painter. He then participated in the 1848 revolution in Austria. In 1849 he became a lieutenant-colonel in the Baden-Palatinate insurgent army.
