= Gustav Adolph Techow =

Gustav Adolph Techow (1813 – 25 May 1890 in Melbourne) was an officer in the Prussian Army, German revolutionary, democrat, and gymnastics educator in Australia.

He was serving with Herman von Natzmer at the Berlin arsenal when the arsenal was stormed by the citizens of Berlin who were upset over revocation of the German constitution and the dissolution National Assembly. Natzmer was the commandant of the arsenal and he became a hero to the insurrectionists all across Europe in 1848 and 1849 because he refused to order his troops to fire on the insurgent citizens when the arsenal was stormed by the citizens on 14 June 1848. In 1849, Techow followed Natzmer to the Palatinate where Techow became Chief of the General Staff of the Baden-Palatinate insurgent army. Following the suppression of the uprising in Badena and the Palatinate, Techow escaped to Switzerland.

In 1852, he emigrated with Natzmer to Australia. There he was an instructor and author for gymnastic exercises. Techow died in 1893.

== Works ==
- Manual of Gymnastic Exercises, for the Use of Schools and at Home. Melbourne 1866. Google Books (5,3 MB)
