= 24th Illinois Infantry Regiment =

24th Regiment Illinois Volunteer Infantry "1st Hecker Regt"
- Illinois state flag
- Active: July 8, 1861, to August 6, 1864
- Country: United States
- Allegiance: Union
- Branch: Infantry
- Engagements: Battle of Perryville Battle of Stones River; Battle of Chickamauga; Battle of Missionary Ridge; Battle of Resaca Battle of Kennesaw Mountain

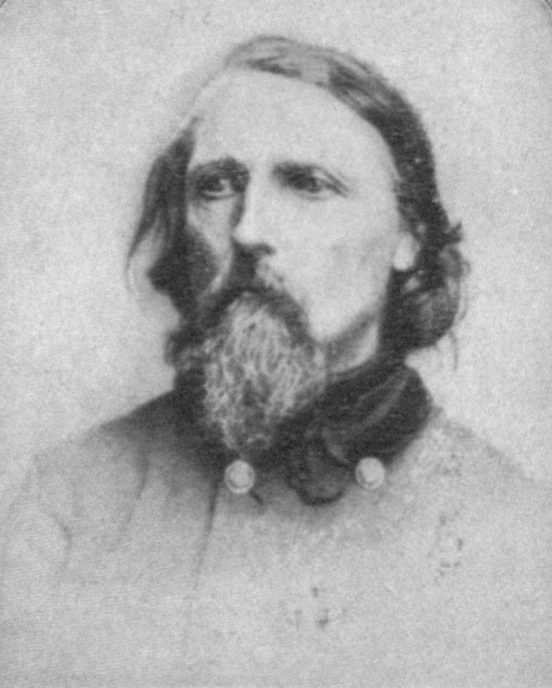
Friedrich Hecker, the first colonel of the regiment

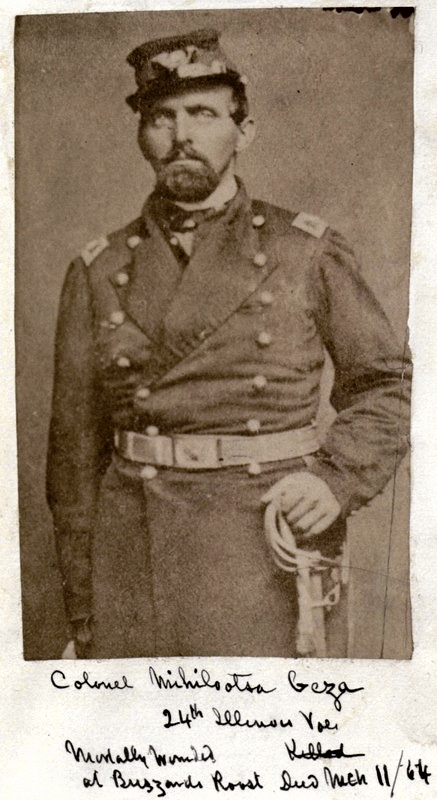
Colonel Geza Mihalotzy

The 24th Regiment Illinois Volunteer Infantry, also known as the 1st Hecker Jaeger Regiment, was an infantry regiment that served in the Union Army during the American Civil War. It was made up almost exclusively of German, Swiss, Hungarian, Czech and Slovak immigrants. It was the first unit mobilised for the war in Chicago, and was composed of many Forty-Eighters, veterans of the revolutions of 1848 in Germany and the Austrian Empire.

== Service ==
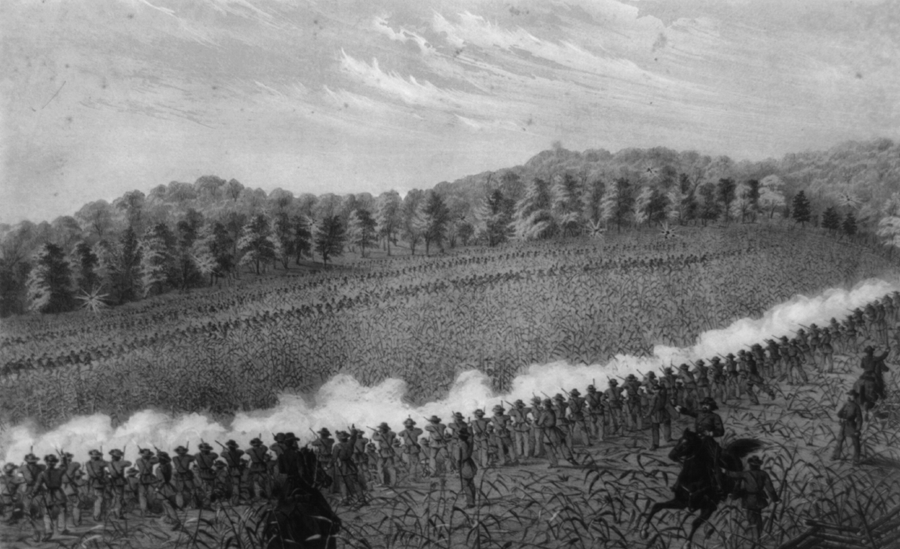
Battle of Perryville--the extreme left--Starkweather's brigade which included the 24th.

The 24th Illinois Infantry was organized at Chicago, Illinois and recruited from counties of Cook, McLean and LaSalle, and mustered into Federal service on July 8, 1861.

The regiment was divided into companies from A to K.

It was assigned to the Army of the Ohio in November 1861 and later was transformed to the Army of the Cumberland in November 1862.

The regiment was mustered out on August 6, 1864.

=== Battles and campaigns they participated in ===
- Battle of Perryville, October 8, 1862
- Battle of Stones River, December 31, 1862 - January 2, 1863
- Tullahoma Campaign, June 24 to July 3, 1863
- Battle of Chickamauga, September 18–20, 1863
- Battle of Missionary Ridge, November 25, 1863
- Atlanta campaign, May 7 – September 2, 1864
  - Battle of Resaca, May 13–15, 1864
  - Battle of Kennesaw Mountain, June 27, 1864

== Total strength and casualties ==
The regiment suffered 3 officers and 86 enlisted men who were killed in action or who died of their wounds and 2 officers and 82 enlisted men who died of disease, for a total of 173 fatalities.

== Prominent personnel ==
- Colonel Frederick Hecker - resigned on December 23, 1861.
- Colonel Géza Mihalotzy - killed on March 11, 1864.
- Colonel Emil Frey
- William Wagner, surgeon, wrote down the regiment's history

== See also ==
- 82nd Illinois Volunteer Infantry Regiment
- List of Illinois Civil War Units
- Illinois in the American Civil War
