= Nerlinger =

Nerlinger is a German surname. Notable people with the surname include:

- Christian Nerlinger (born 1973), German footballer
- Manfred Nerlinger (born 1960), German weightlifter, trainer, and entrepreneur
- Oskar Nerlinger (1893–1969), German painter
