= Sterling Records (Sweden) =

- Founded: 1980
- Founder: Bo Hyttner
- Genre: Classical
- Country of origin: Sweden
- Official website: naxosdirect.se/labels/sterling-records-27552

Sterling Records is a classical music record label, specializing in releasing world premiere recordings of the orchestral work of romantic composers.

The label was founded by Stockholm resident Bo Hyttner as a continuation of his record shop in 1980. Since then, it has released over eighty CDs, most of them containing works that were previously unavailable on record. Sterling is known for its series of 'national' romantic repertoire, e.g. 'Swedish romantics', 'German romantics', and so on.

== See also ==
- Hans Huber (Composer)
- List of record labels
