= Żychliński =

Żychliński is a Polish surname. Notable people with the surname include:

- Ludwik Żychliński (1837–?), Polish activist
- Rajzel Żychlińsky (1910–2001), Polish-American poet
- Teodor Żychliński (1830–1909), Polish historian, diarist and journalist
