= Theodor Ludwig Greiner =

Theodor Ludwig Greiner was a German-born lawyer who held democratic beliefs. Thus, he became a member of the Palatinate Provisional Government in 1849. After the government was crushed by the Prussian counter-revolutionary authorities, Greiner fled to Switzerland and then to the United States.
