= Stephen Born =

German typesetter and revolutionary

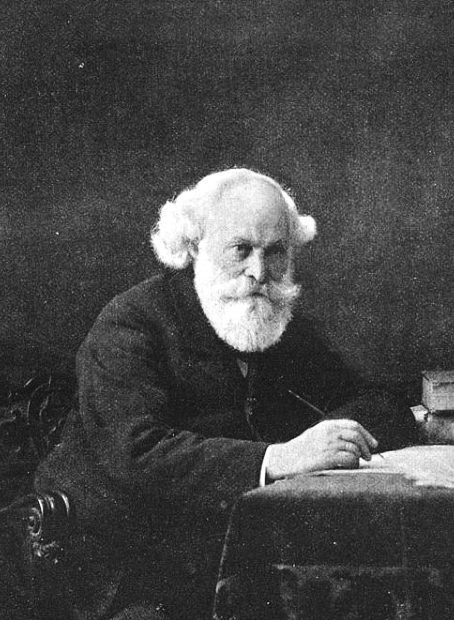
Stephen Born.

Stephen Born (né Simon Buttermilch; 28 December 1824 – 4 May 1898) was a German typesetter and revolutionary. As a founder of the General German Workers' Brotherhood, he created the first national trade union organization in the German workers' movement.

He was born in Lissa, Prussian Province of Posen (Leszno, Poland) in 1824 and moved to Berlin in 1840. Born was a member of the Communist League, but his philosophy was more inclined toward reformism during the revolution of 1848–49. Born was the supreme commander of the insurgency in the town of Dresden in 1849. After the defeat of the uprisings of 1849, Born left the worker's movement. He died in 1898 in Basel, Switzerland.
