= Joseph Fickler =

German journalist

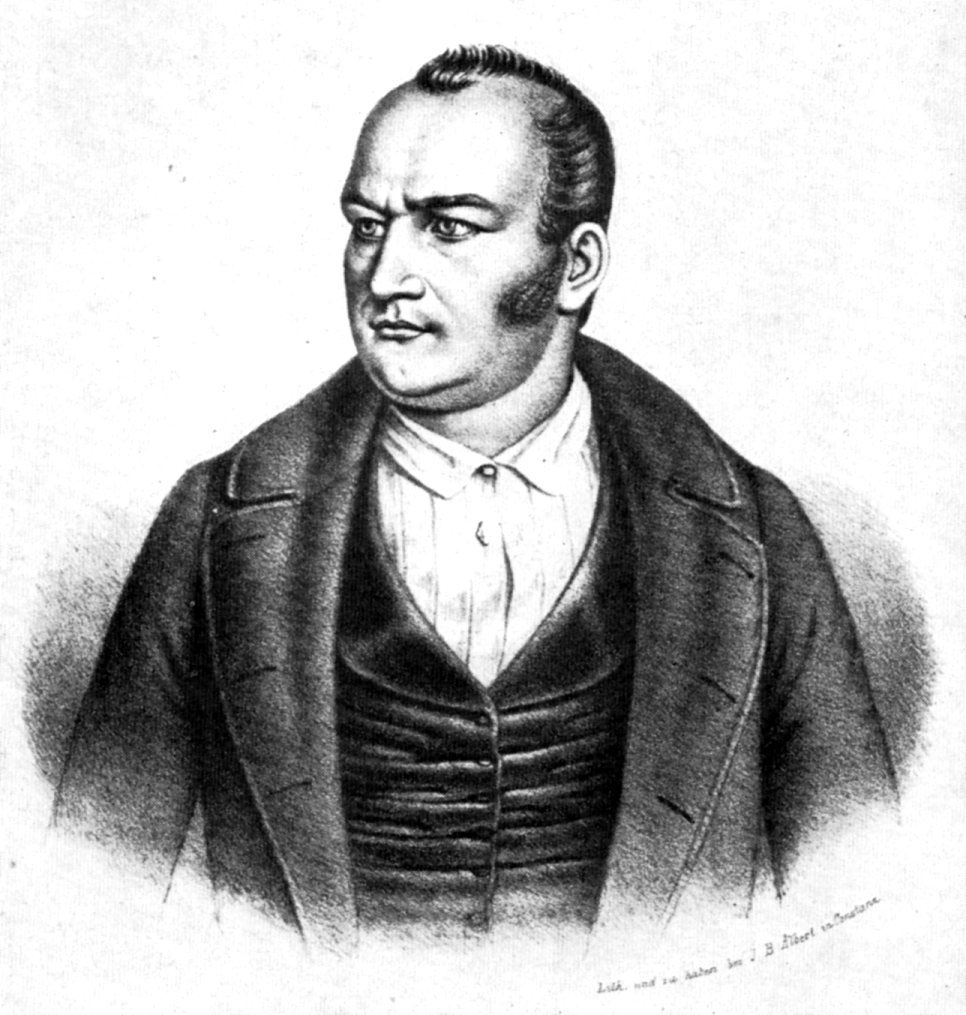
Joseph Fickler.

Joseph Fickler (1808–1865) was a German journalist. A democrat by philosophy, Fickler became a leader of the Baden democratic movement. In 1849, he became a member of the Baden revolutionary provisional government. He died in 1865.
