= Herman von Natzmer =

- Born: 1806
- Died: 1858 (aged 51–52)
- Allegiance: Prussia
- Service / branch: Prussian Army

Herman von Natzmer (1806–1858) was an officer in the Prussian Army and commander of an infantry located in Berlin. On June 14, 1848, the arsenal under his command was stormed by the citizens of Berlin who were protesting the dissolution of the National Assembly and the revocation of the German Constitution by King Frederick Wilhelm IV. Natzmer refused to order his troops to fire on the citizens. For his disobedience, he was tried, convicted, and sentenced to 15 years in prison. He became a hero to insurrectionists across Europe. In 1849, Natzmer escaped from prison and fled to the Palatinate where he took part in the Baden-Palatinate uprising. Following the suppression of the uprising, Natzmer escaped to Switzerland and later to England. In 1852, he emigrated to Australia. Natzmer died in 1858.
