= Storming of Freiburg =

Coordinates: 48°0′N 7°51′E

- Part of Baden Revolution
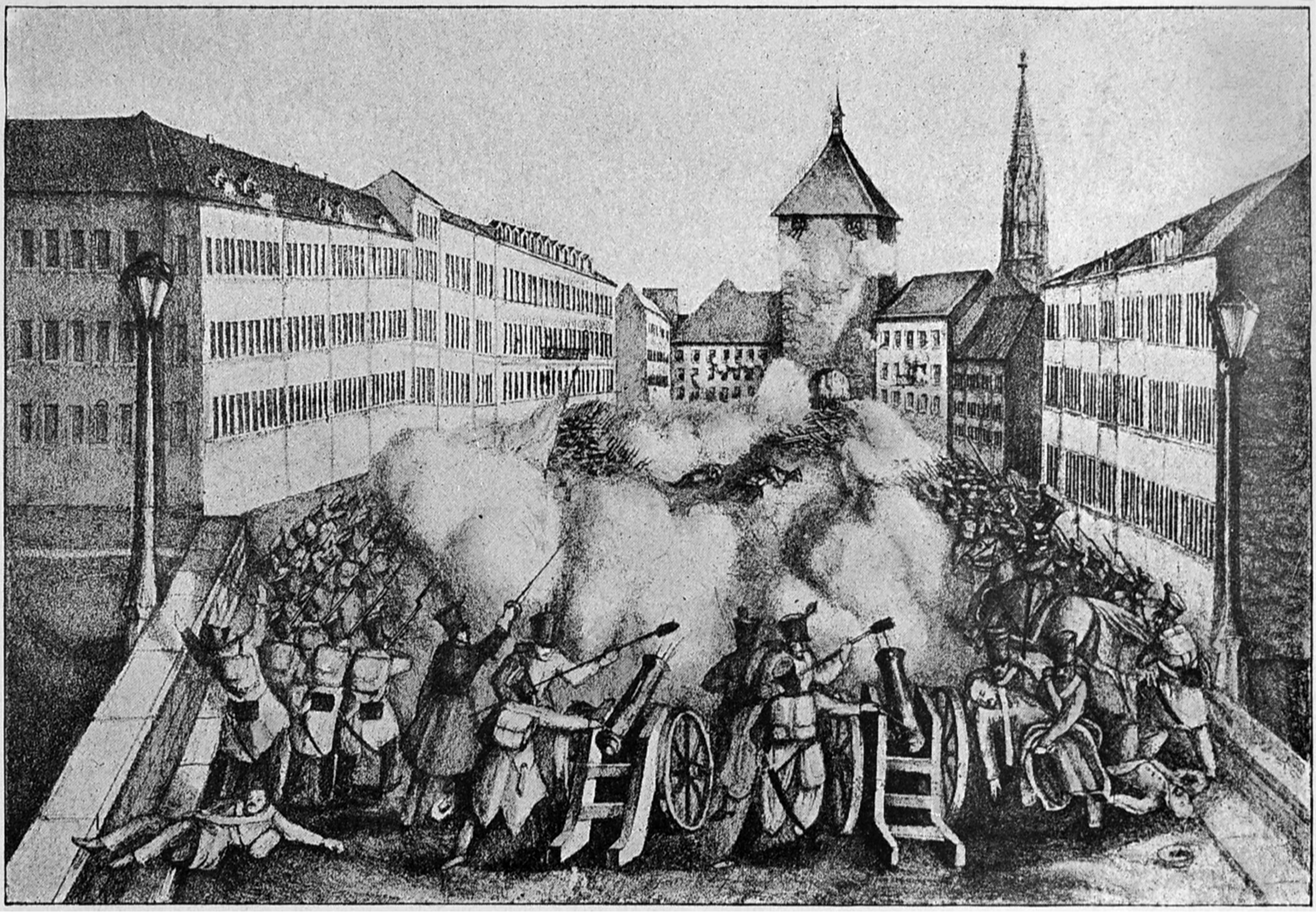
- Storming of the barricades at the Breisach Gate
Date	24 April 1848
Location	Freiburg im Breisgau
Result	Freiburg is occupied by federal troops

Belligerents
Republican volunteers (Freischärler)	2nd Division of the VIII Army Corps of the German Confederation with units from: Grand Duchy of Baden; Duchy of Nassau; Grand Duchy of Hesse;

Commanders and leaders
Georg von Langsdorff	General Friedrich Hoffmann

Strength
1,200	6,000

Casualties and losses
11 dead; 13 wounded	14 dead; 20 wounded

The Storming of Freiburg (German: Sturm auf Freiburg) took place on 24 April 1848 during the Baden Revolution. Units of the VIII Army Corps of the German Confederation stormed the town of Freiburg im Breisgau, which was occupied by republican volunteers (Freischärlern).

== Bloody Easter 1848 ==
On 22 April an assembly of 3,000 to 4,000 people gathered in Freiburg, of whom 1,200 to 1,400 were armed. The military had withdrawn from the town. Following the defeat of Friedrich Hecker on 20 April at the Battle of the Scheideck, Karl von Rotteck junior and Carl Mez tried in vain to persuade the Freischaren in Freiburg to avoid an armed uprising, which is why the republicans described them later as traitors. The rebels did not believe the news of Hecker’s defeat and expected relief from a Freischar of an estimated 5,000 men under Franz Sigel which was approaching Freiburg.

On the following day the die Freiburg militia (Bürgerwehr), tried to prevent the Freischärler from taking over the town's guns; however, the leaders of the militia backed down and their troops eventually held back. The commander of the advancing federal troops threatened to storm the town if the militia and barricades were not removed. The deadline was repeatedly extended – eventually to 4 pm. About 3.30 pm, firing from the Battle at Günterstal was heard in Freiburg, which now prevented the federal troops from storming Freiburg. In the town even larger groups of Freischars began gathering again, because those who had already got ready to march off now stayed behind. The Freischärler now fetched one of the town's cannons to intervene in the battle of Günterstal. Later, the volunteers also fetched the other three guns from the town armoury and brought them into position by the town gates.

On 24 April the Freischärler requisitioned weapons from Freiburg's town houses. Around 9.30 am the federal troops, on the orders of General Friedrich Hoffmann, began their attack on the town. Around St Martin's Gate (Martinstor) heavy fighting raged, but the troops from Hesse-Nassau broke through here onto Kaiserstraße and were the first federal troops into the town. Baden soldiers entered down Jesuitengasse and the Zähringen Gate (Zähringertor) and, at the Preachers' Gate (Predigertor) soldiers from Hesse-Nassau and Baden entered. Around 11 o'clock Freiburg was full in the hands of federal forces. Several houses in the town were damaged in the fighting and there were casualties amongst the civilian population. The expected relief of Freiburg from the approaching Freischärler under Franz Sigel and Theodor Mögling came too late, which presumably avoided greater damage to the town.

General Hoffmann declared martial law and had all inhabitants of the town disarmed. Many of the Freischärlers were taken prisoner. In addition, a number of Freiburg's citizens were arrested, including Karl von Rotteck junior. The commandant of the Freischärler, Georg von Langsdorff, was a member of the Freiburg Gymnastic Club of 1844. The Baden State Government disbanded the club on 25 April, because other members had taken part in the uprising.

On 26 April the commander of the VIII Army Corps of the German Confederation, Prince Frederick of Württemberg entered in Freiburg and held a parade of his troops on 28 April.

== Commemoration ==
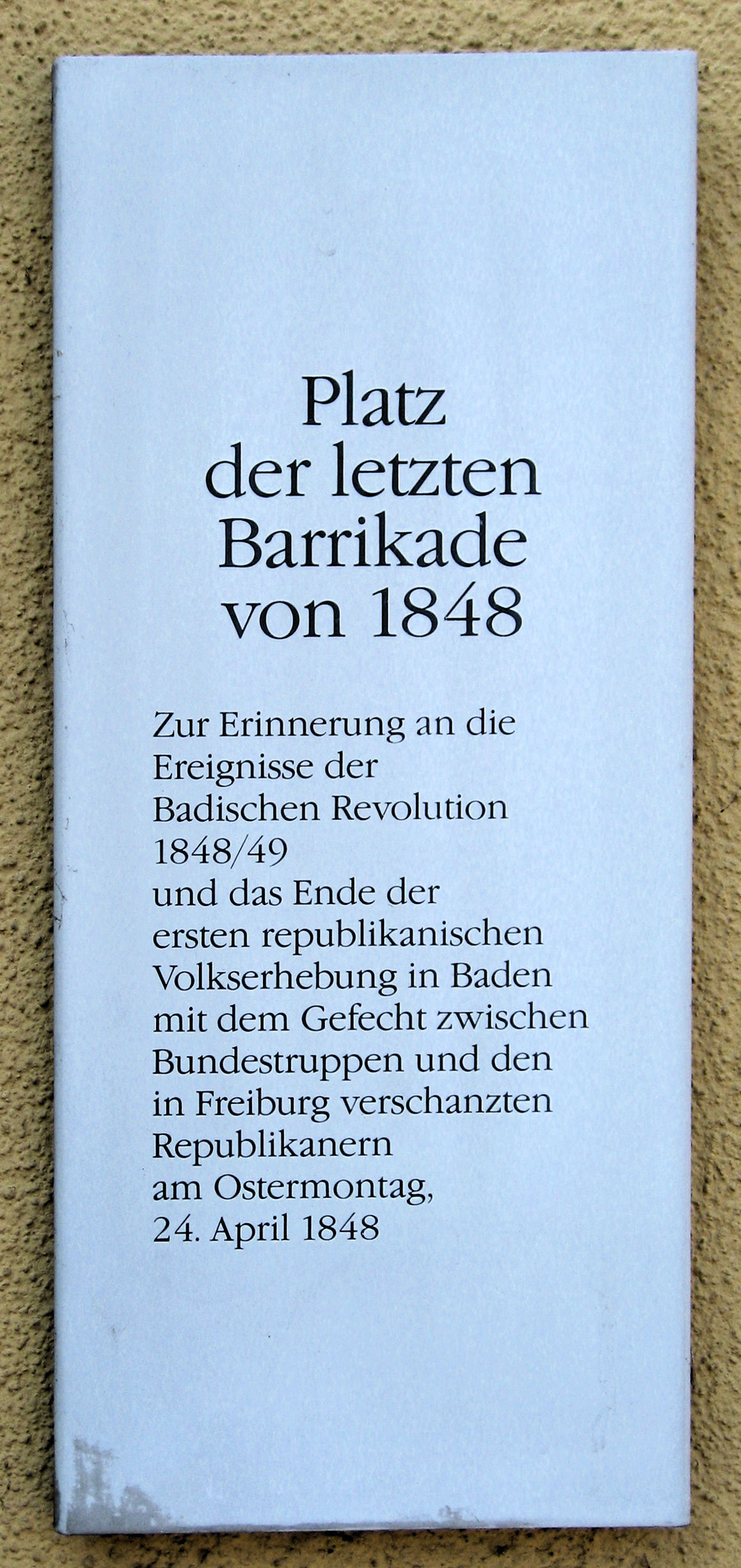
Commemorative plaque

At the place unofficially described as the "site of the last barricade" (Platz der letzten Barrikade) next to the Swabian Gate (Schwabentor) a plaque recalls the events of that time.

== Literature ==
- Joseph L. Wohleb: Freiburg in der 48er Revolution. In: Schau-ins-Land, Issue 69, 1950, pp. 102-118 online at UB Freiburg
