= Battle of Günterstal =

Coordinates: 47°58′15.35″N 7°51′7.3″E

- Part of Baden Revolution
Date	23 April 1848
Location	Jägerbrunnen near Günterstal

Belligerents
republican Freischärler (irregulars)	Grand Duchy of Baden; Grand Duchy of Hesse

Commanders and leaders
Gustav Struve; Franz Sigel	General Friedrich Hoffmann

Casualties and losses
at least 20 deaths	at least 3 deaths

The Battle of Günterstal took place on 23 April 1848 during the Baden Revolution at Jägerbrunnen not far from the village of Günterstal. Here government troops stopped a vanguard of the militants who were advancing towards the city of Freiburg im Breisgau under Franz Sigel.

== Background ==
During the Baden Revolution, after the defeat of Friedrich Hecker at Kandern, the Baden government gathered its own and Hessian troops around Freiburg to clear the city of rebels. On 22 April 1848, around 1,500 Freischärler (irregulars) barricaded themselves in Freiburg, waiting anxiously for their relief by the force of 5,000 men who they had heard were advancing under Franz Sigel's command from Horben to Freiburg. In order to monitor the whereabouts of these troops, the insurgents, who were practically surrounded, sent a delegation under Hermann Mors in the direction of Horben. The delegation finally came across Sigel's vanguard of about 300 men under Gustav Struve, who reported: "The band of Freiburgers asked us to advance on Freiburg as quickly as possible, clearing the city itself of enemy troops, except those in the vicinity who are favourably disposed towards the people. The Freiburgers presented the matter to us as if it were only a question of taking possession of the city. In the absence of Sigel, we were unanimously of the opinion that we could not wait any longer, all the less since Sigel, since he was mounted, could easily overtake the column and assume overall command.

== Battle ==
Impressed by the request of the Freiburg delegation and spurred on by ambition, Struve rushed forward with his small force against Sigel's express orders. Sigel reports on Struve's going it alone: "Without taking the necessary precautionary measures, they descended into the valley to village of Günthersthal and moved in a column along the valley towards Freiburg. But when they arrived at the mouth of the valley, they suddenly met - as could have been foreseen - the enemy who had positioned themselves there and, after a brief parley, opened fire with artillery and infantry. As was could clearly have been predicted after the battle of Kandern and the behaviour of the royalists, ... the commanding officer did not enter into any negotiations, but replied to the former Baden artillery officer Kunzer, when he asked him whether Struve could speak a few words: "Away, away you dog". Kunzer addressed the artillery team with the words: "You won't shoot, your fathers and brothers are over there," whereupon the commander gave the battalion standing next to him the order to fire. With the exclamation "Murdering your fathers and brothers!" Kunzer rode back. His horse received a slight wound as a result of the shots that pursued him.

The men in the front line, armed only with scythes, panicked after the first salvoes of grapeshot and ran away, some throwing away their scythes. Sigel, alarmed by the rifle and grapeshot fire, rushed down from Horben to Günterstal with a troop just in time and counterattacked the government troops. The battle lasted from half past three in the afternoon to seven in the evening. Much blood flowed on both sides. At least 20 militants and three soldiers lost their lives at the Jägerbrunnen. The 2nd Grand Duchy of Hesse Regiment fought with the Baden Army units.

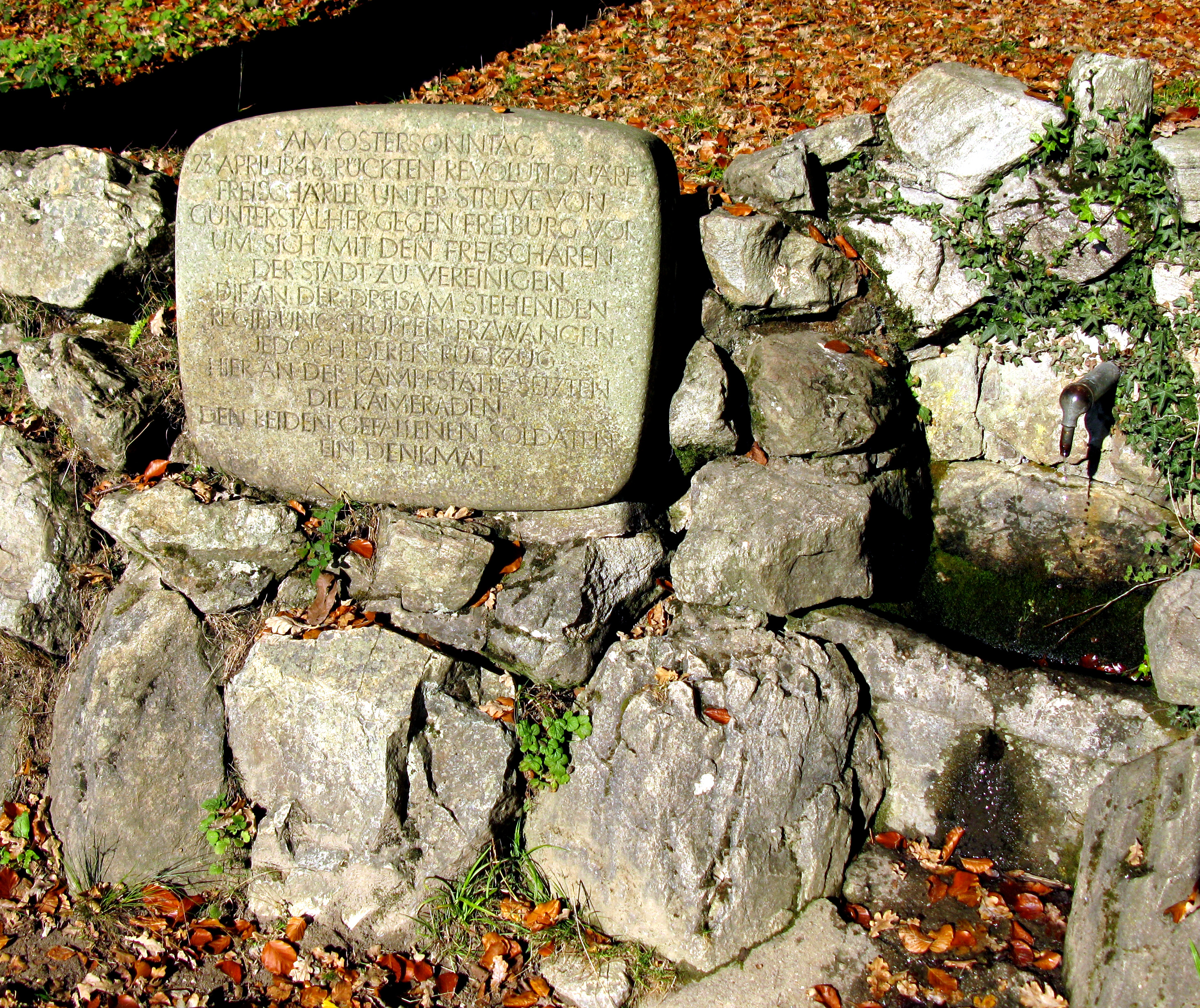
Memorial at Jägerbrunnen with the inscription: On Easter Sunday, 23 April 1848, revolutionary Freischärler under Struve advanced from Günterstal towards Freiburg to unite with the Freischärler of the city. The government troops standing at the Dreisam, however, forced their withdrawal. Here on the battlefield, the comrades erected a memorial to the two fallen soldiers.

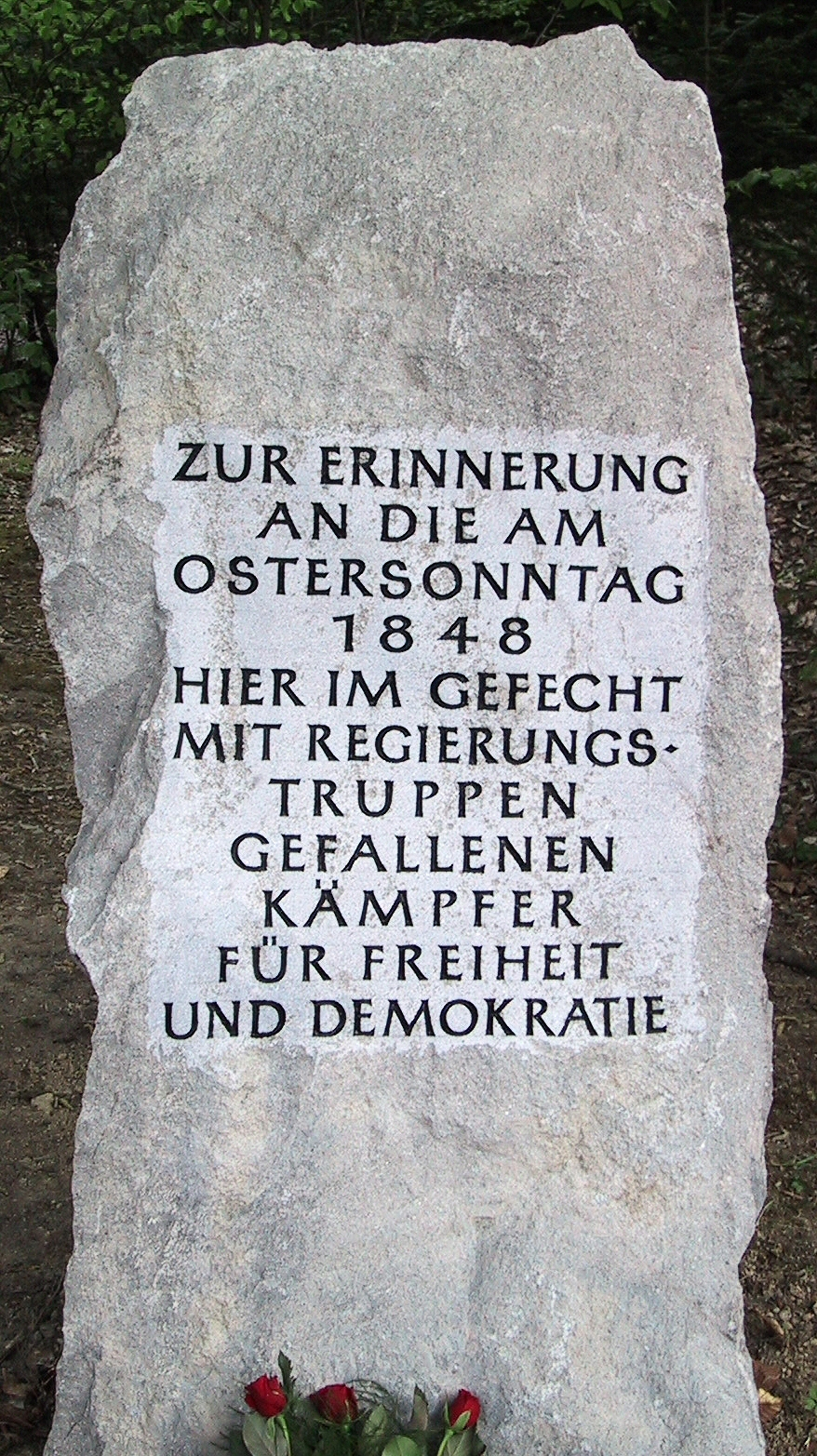
Freischärler memorial with the inscription: In memory of the fighters for freedom and democracy who fell in battle against government troops on Easter Sunday 1848

== Literature ==
- F. Hecker: Die Erhebung des Volkes in Baden für die deutsche Republik im Frühjahr 1848, Druck von J. C. Schadelitz, Basel 1849 online in der Google-Buchsuche
- Karin Groll: Eine verpaßte Chance? Das Gefecht bei Günterstal in Augenzeugenberichten und Erinnerungen. In: Badische Heimat, Band 70, 1990, S. 567–576
