= Wehr, Baden-Württemberg =

Wehr
- Town
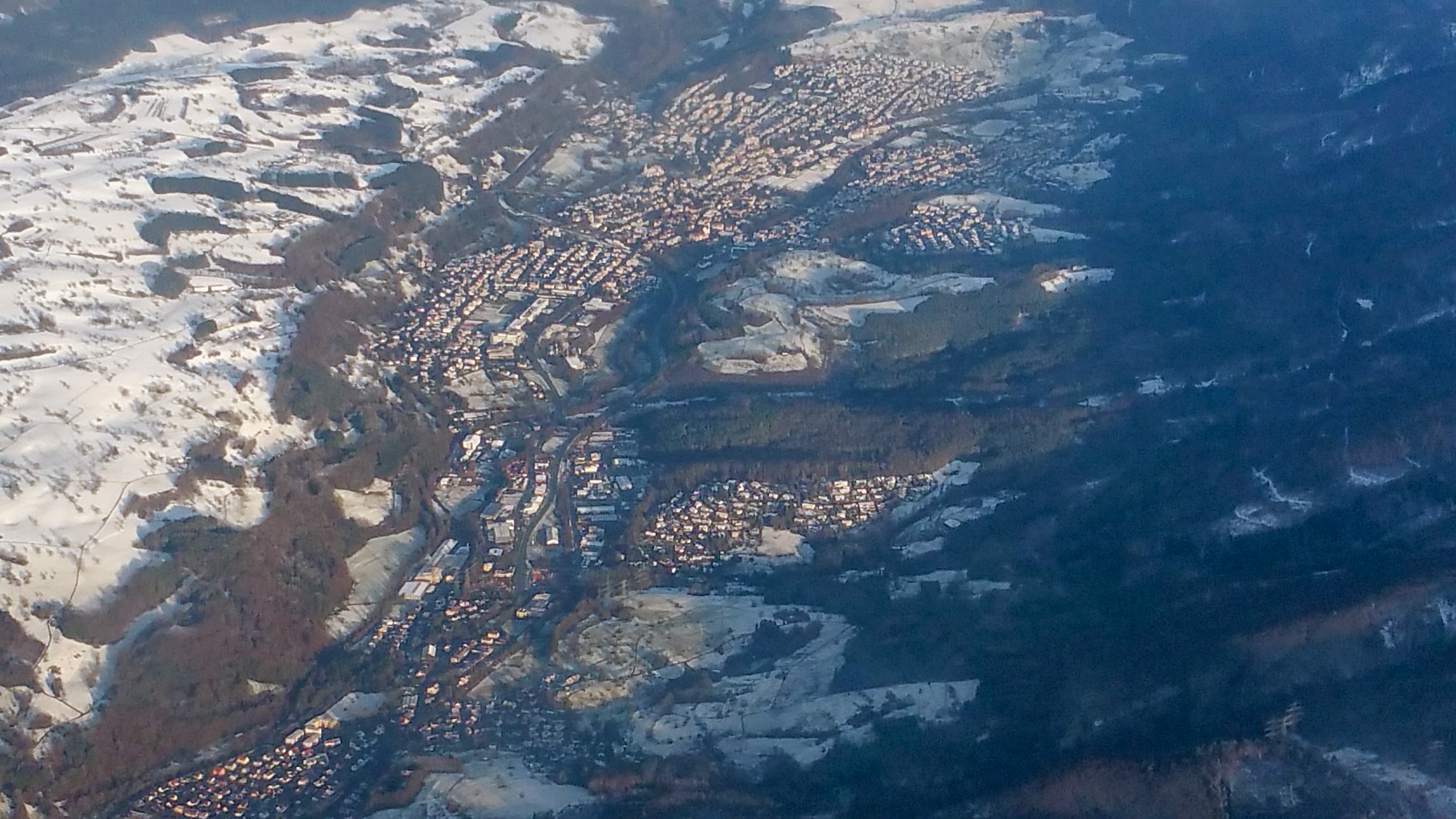
- Aerial view

- Coat of arms

- Location of Wehr within Waldshut district
- Interactive map of Wehr
- Location within Germany Location within Baden-Württemberg
- Coordinates: 47°37′47″N 7°54′16″E
- Country: Germany
- State: Baden-Württemberg
- Admin. region: Freiburg
- District: Waldshut

Government
  - Mayor (2018–26): Michael Thater (Ind.)

Area
  - Total: 35.66 km^{2} (13.77 sq mi)
- Elevation: 366 m (1,201 ft)

Population (2025-12-31)
  - Total: 13,102
  - Density: 367.4/km^{2} (951.6/sq mi)
- Time zone: UTC+01:00 (CET)
  - Summer (DST): UTC+02:00 (CEST)
- Postal codes: 79664
- Dialling codes: 07762 (and 07761 for Brennet and Öflingen)
- Vehicle registration: WT
- Website: www.wehr.de

Wehr (German pronunciation: [veːɐ̯]) is a town in the Waldshut district in Baden-Württemberg, Germany. It is situated 9 km north of Bad Säckingen, and 18 km east of Lörrach. Wehr is the home of two very old and large families: the Trefzgers and the Nagelins.

It is also home to the Weck Jar company.

On 25 September 1848, after the loss of the Battle of Staufen, which had ended the Second Baden Uprising, Gustav Struve one of the leaders of the Baden Revolution, was captured at the Krone inn in Wehr.
