= Federal Army (disambiguation) =

The Federal Army was the army of Mexico from 1876 to 1914.

Federal Army may also refer to:

- German Federal Army, army of the German Confederation from 1815 to 1866.
- Austrian Armed Forces, or Bundesheer, literally "Federal Army"
- Swiss Armed Forces
- Union Army during the American Civil War, 1861—1865
