= Zinnfigurenklause =

German museum

Coordinates: 47°59′34″N 07°51′15″E

Die Zinnfigurenklause im Schwabentor
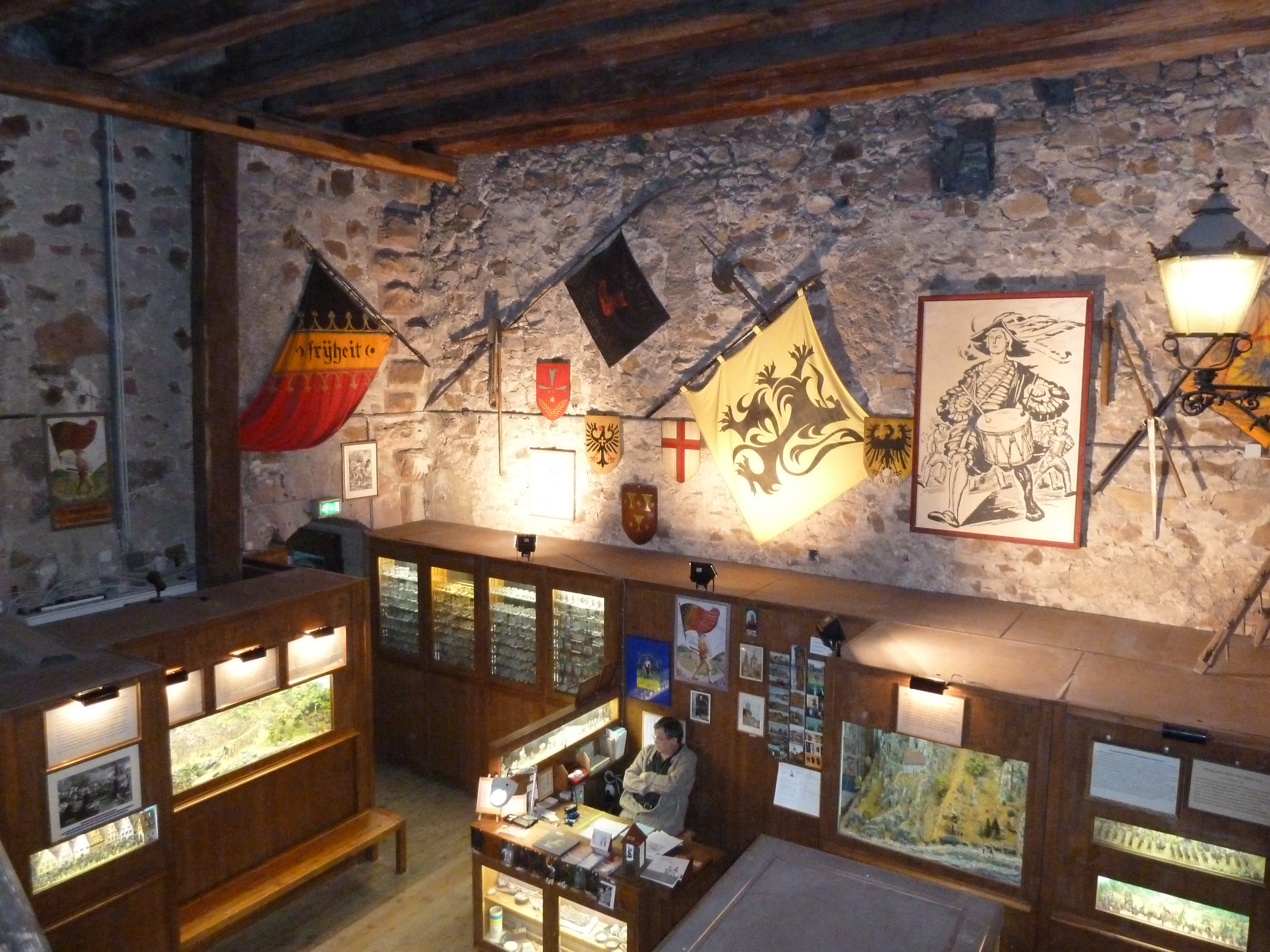
- The museum's entrance area in the first floor
- Established: 1965
- Location: Freiburg im Breisgau
- Type: historic site
- Website: zinnfigurenklause-freiburg.de

The Zinnfigurenklause is a private museum in Freiburg im Breisgau that depicts the history of the Schwabentor in south-eastern Germany.

== History ==
Arthur-Andreas Lehmann, a skilled compositor and member of the working group "Burgen der Heimat" (castles of the homeland), had been working on his tin figures and models of castles for years before he established the Zinnfigurenklause museum across from the German inn "Schiff" in May 1969.

In the Zinnfigurenklause, historical events are depicted by small tin figures and further explained with pictures.

Eugen Keidel, mayor of Freiburg, made the first floor of the Schwabentor available to Lehmann in 1969. At that time, the Schwabentor was unutilized and in need of rehabilitation. The second floor of the Schwabentor would be later used by Lehmann as well.

The city of Freiburg bought twelve of the dioramas that Lehmann had created in the years leading up to 1985. Lehmann administered the Zinnfigurenklause between 1985 and 1989. After he died in 1989 in the age of 80, Andreas Müller, who had previously filled in for Lehmann while he was absent, took charge of the museum in the meantime. On November 2, 1989, Müller founded a society for the promotion of the Zinnfigurenklause of which he acted as chairman.

In December 1989, the city of Freiburg made Müller responsible for the care of the collection. The city of Freiburg does not charge rent for the museum's rooms, and pays for lighting, heating and cleaning. The Zinnfigurenklause is a private museum and independent of other urban museums. However, these museums have representation in the society for promotion founded by Müller. After Andreas Müller retired in 2008, Volkmar Vogt, head of the Freiburg Archive of Social Movements (Archiv Soziale Bewegungen) took charge of the management of the Zinnfigurenklause. Martin Wiebel is the chairman of the society for the promotion of the Zinnfigurenklause in the Schwabentor. Volkmar Vogt is a member of the extended board of the society.

Since 1983, the Archives of social movements have been collecting print media that deal with topics related to the new social movements

== Collection ==
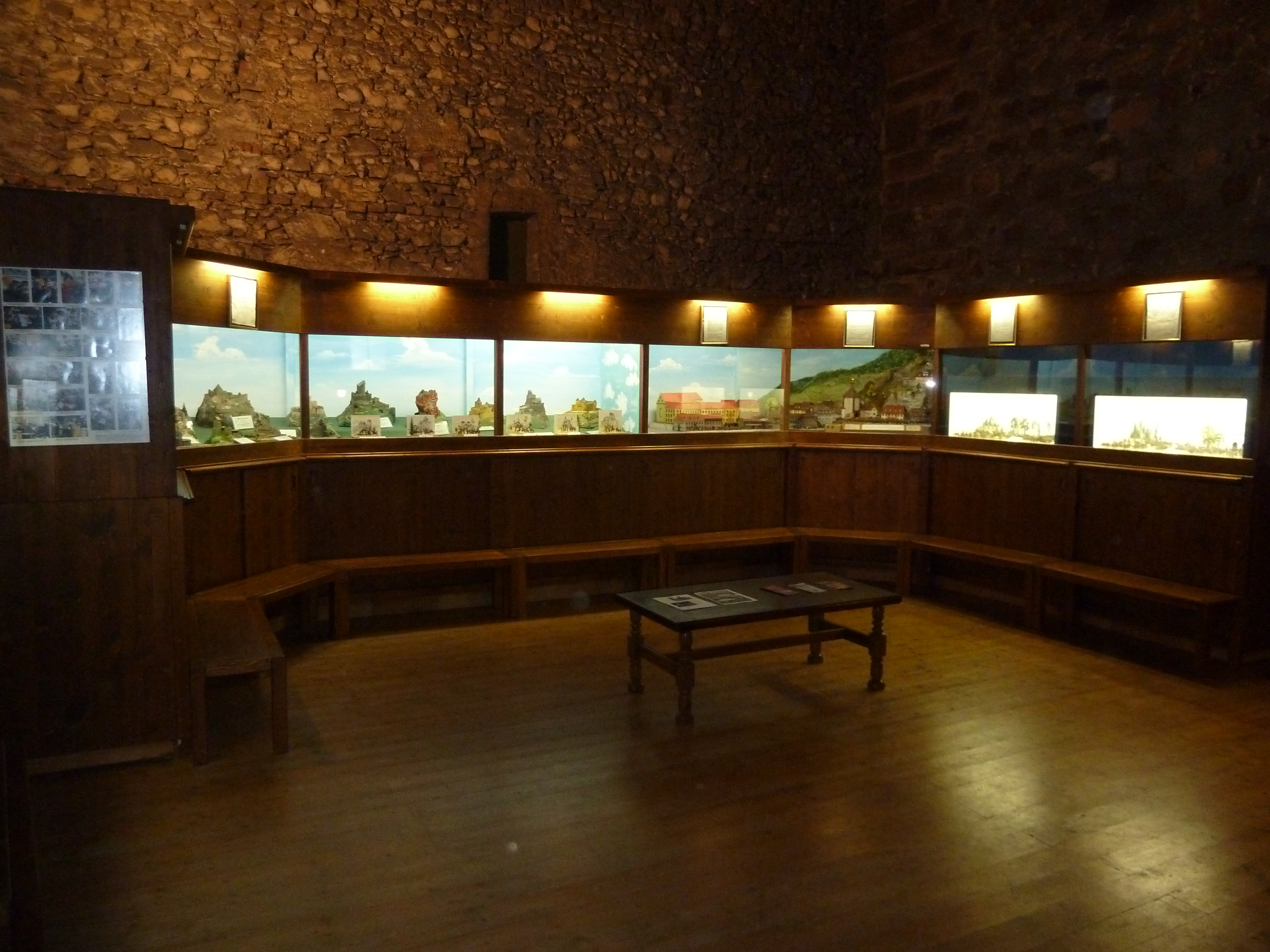
Castles in the second floor

The collection of the museum consists of 9000 tin figures in 21 dioramas which, among other scenes, depict the Battle of Sempach in 1386 (which makes up for 1150 of the figures), a battle from the Swabian-Swiss War of 1499, the German Peasant's War of 1525 that took place in the Black Forest region of Germany, the siege of the Küssaburg/Oberlauchringen, the events of the Badische Revolution and a siege from War of the Spanish Succession. Furthermore, there are diorama with castles of the Hochrhein und Oberrhein, the hunting of witches, and the examination of Martin Luther in Worms. Many of the tin figures are threatened by Tin pest and must be occasionally recast and repainted. The museum is open to visitors only during the summertime (from the third Saturday in May until the third of October).
