= Freiburger Turnerschaft von 1844 =

German sport club

The Freiburger Turnerschaft von 1844 e.V., FT 1844 Freiburg for short, is a sport club from Freiburg im Breisgau and is the largest sport club in south Baden with 6,500 members. The club is part of the Badischer Sportbund Freiburg, and is one of the founding members of the Freiburg Kreis (Sportverein). The club offers leisure sports, popular sports, and competitive sports. The club owns two private locations with sports facilities on about 50,000 m^{2}, as well as 18 off-site sports halls. About 1000 hours of sports are logged each week, about half of that under the guidance of trained personnel. Additionally, the club offers five social-pedagogical facilities as well as a sports elementary school for children.

The club also supports individual competitive athletes, such as the extreme athlete Brigid Wefelnberg and the beach volleyball player Leonie Müller, both of whom represent the club.

== History ==
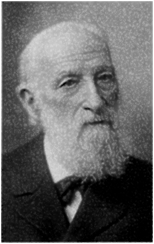
Georg von Langsdorff, the founder

In 1844, the gymnastics club was founded by a medical student named Georg von Langsdorff. The club was banned in 1848 for being a danger to the state, because a group of armed gymnasts and the founder, Georg von Langsdorff, were part of the Freischar involved in the Storming of Freiburg. After a 12-year forced break, the club was allowed to open again in 1860. In 1895, the club was the first club in southern Germany to found a women's section. In 1905, the club inaugurated a new sports compound on the property of the old fairgrounds, located next to the Schwarzwaldstraße. Dr. Ludwig Aschoff, chairman of the club, saw the Freiburger urnerschaft von 1844 e.V. grow in 1919, when the three gymnastics clubs in Freiburg merged. On 21 July 1931, the new club grounds, now the FT-Sportpark, was initiated. In 1945, the club was disbanded because of Directive Nr. 23 of the Allied Control Council. The grounds of the club were taken over by the French. The replacement came in the form of the VfL Freiburg, which was a placeholder organisation. In 1949, the FT 1844 was able to form again under its old name. After that, the club was able to expand successfully. For example, the FT 1844 built the third club swimming pool in Germany, came up with the idea of the first German sports kindergarten, and, in 1978, the club introduced socially differentiated family rates as part of the idea of "vacation in the sports park".

On its 150-year anniversary, the club had 22 sports departments, about 100 leisure sports groups, about 300 course offerings, and logged more than 1000 sport hours per week. In 2001, the Freiburg district of Rieselfeld founded the new FT-sports kindergarten, which, by 2007, led to the first sports elementary school in Germany. The largest sporting event the club has organised so far took place in Freiburg with the 54th Artistic roller skating world championship 2009, which featured about 1000 athletes representing 20 nations.

Former Regierungspräsident, Norbert Nothhelfer (*1937), was elected president of the gymnastics club in April 2010, following the death of his predecessor, Conrad Schroeder, in 2006.

== Education and sports ==
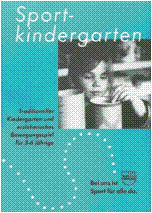
The first German sports kindergarten in 1972

The FT 1844 has been involved with a combination of raising children, education, and sports since the 1970s. in 1972, the club conceptualized a sports kindergarten. In 2007, after starting four further socio-pedagogical institutions, including an integrative sports kindergarten, the FT 1844 founded the first German sports elementary school. In 2010, this school was officially recognized by the state, which allowed the teachers to give students leaving elementary school the so-called "Lehrerempfehlung". The state's approval also allows the use of a proper school building, to be constructed upon the school grounds, instead of the four containers that are in use. The state's approval was a prerequisite for the construction of the roughly 500-m^{2} school building. In 1990, the club, in cooperation with the University Medical Center Freiburg, founded its first course offering for obese children as part of its pedagogical goals.

== Location ==
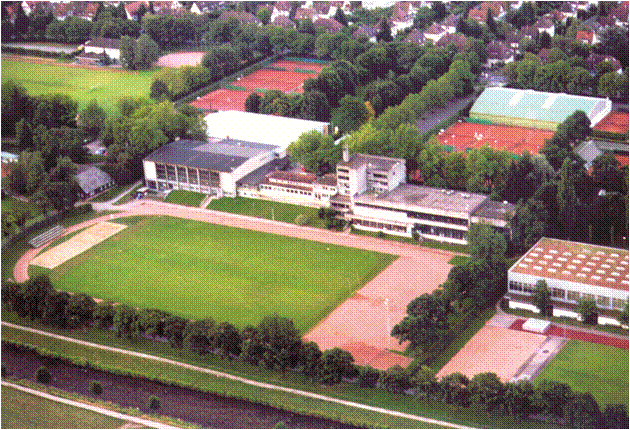
FT-Sportpark from the air

The main location for the FT 1844 is the FT-Sportpark in the Schwarzwaldstraße. The grounds are made up of ten gyms, each with a turf and astroturf field, as well as tennis court. In 2004, a fitness and health studio was built, following a restructuring of the premises. Furthermore, the club has a beach volleyball facility called the Dreisam-Beach, as well as a private swimming pool, which was renovated in 2011. The club also has a restaurant and a hotel as part of their facilities.

Since 2001, the Freiburg district of Freiburg im Breisgau has had a FT-sports kindergarten with two further gyms.

More facilities can be had in the form of gyms, fields, and courts of Freiburg schools.

== Collaboration ==
The swimmers of the club's swimming division compete together with the swimmers of the Freiburg swimming team in the SG Regio Freiburg.

== Accomplishments ==
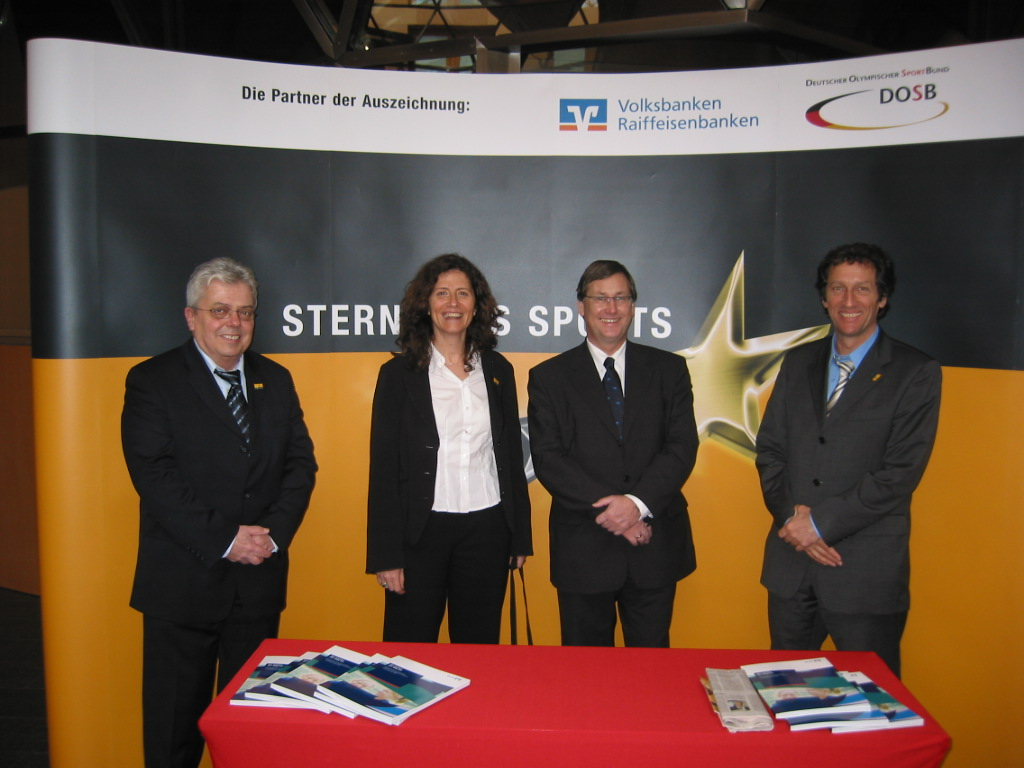
Walter Hasper (Manager), Katharina Kalogerudi (director of the socio-pedagogical institutions), Patrick T. Evers (chairman) and Günther Giselbrecht (school administrator) at the presentation ceremony of the "Sterne des Sports"

The FT 1844's athletes in the roller figure skating discipline are particularly successful: At the world championships they received 10 gold medals, 11 silver medals, and 11 bronze medals. At the European championships they received 21 gold medals, 20 silver medals, and 16 bronze medals.

- 1959 Romi Weiß Student World Champion in Fencing
- 1963: Roland Losert (Junior World Champion in épée fencing)
- 1964: Romi Weiß (Bronze at the 1964 Summer Olympicsin Tokyo in team foil fencing)
- 1965: Helga Flöhl (Vice World Champion in synchronized trampolining)
- 1968: Michael Obrecht (Vice World Champion in artistic figure skating)
- 1970: Christine Kreuzfeldt (World Champion in artistic figure skating), Michael Obrecht (World Champion), Markus Gallmann (Vice World Champion in artistic figure skating)
- 1971: Michael Obrecht (World Champion), Markus Gallmann (Third place at the World Championship in artistic figure skating)
- 1974: Michael Obrecht (World Champion in artistic figure skating)
- 1975: Michael Obrecht (Vice World Champion in artistic figure skating)
- 1981: Ingrid Losert (Vice World Champion (Team) in Fencing)
- 1982: Ingrid Losert (Third place (Team) at the World Championship in Fencing), Fréderique Florentin (3-time Junior European Champion Figures/Freestyle/Combination in artistic figure skating), Susanne Schoeffler (Vice World Champion in trampolining)
- 1983: Ingrid Losert (Vice World Champion (Team) in Fencing)
- 1985: Fréderique Florentin (Vice World Champion Combination, 2-time European Champion Figures/Combination, Vice-European Champion Freestyle in artistic figure skating)
- 1986: Fréderique Florentin (Bronze medal in artistic figure skating World Championship in Figures, 2-time European Champion in Figures/Combination, Vice European Champion in Freestyle)
- 1987: Fréderique Florentin (European Champion in artistic figure skating in Figures, 2-time Vice European Champion in Freestyle/Combination)
- 1988: Fréderique Florentin (World Champion in artistic figure skating in Figures, Vice World Champion in Combination, European Champion in Figures, 3rd place in European Championship in Combination)
- 1989: Jörg Finger (Vice World Champion (Amateurs) in Skateboard-freestyle), Fréderique Florentin (Vice World Champion in artistic figure skating Figures)
- 1990: Sandra Siwinna (3rd Place in World Championship of synchronised and Team trampolining), Markus Kaiser (Bronze medal at World Championship of artistic figure skating in Figures/Combination)
- 1991: Sandra Siwinna (3rd Place in World Championship in Team trampolining), Markus Kaiser (3rd Place at World Championship of artistic figure skating)
- 1998: Stefan Müller (World Champion in the men's master class in artistic figure skating Figures)
- 2000: Andreas Scheuerpflug (Competed in Beach volleyball at the 2000 Summer Olympics - Men's tournament)
- 2001: Daniel Müller (World Champion in artistic figure skating Figures)
- 2002: Frank Albiez (World Champion in artistic figure skating Combination), Daniel Müller (3rd Place in artistic figure skating world championship in artistic figure skating)
- 2003: Frank Albiez (Vice World Champion in artistic figure skating Figures, 3rd place in artistic figure skating World Championship Combination)
- 2004: Frank Albiez (World Champion in artistic figure skating in Fresno and European Champion in artistic figure skating Figures), Lars Clad (Junior Vice World Champion and Vice European Champion in artistic figure skating Figures), Fabian Clad (Youth European Champion in artistic figure skating in Figures), Daniel Müller (Bronze medal in artistic figure skating World Championship and European Championship)
- 2005: Frank Albiez (Vice World Champion and European Champion in artistic figure skating in the disciplines: Figures, Combination), Daniel Müller (Bronze medal in artistic figure skating World Championship and European Championship in the disciplines: Figures, Combination)
- 2009: Dörte Baumert (Junior European Champion in 4 × 100 m swimming), Lars Clad (European Champion in artistic figure skating Figures)
- The Men's Volleyball team has been playing in the 2. Deutsche Volleyball-Bundesliga (Männer) since 2001.

In 1985, the FT 1844 was awarded the Sportplakette des Bundespräsidenten, and in 2007 the club received the Großer Stern des Sports of the Deutscher Olympischer Sportbund. Both of the awards were awarded for the support and promotion of sports by the club.

== Divisions ==
- Freiburg Sacristans – American Football

== Football ==
On 13 December 1919, the SC Freiburg joined the FT 1844 and formed the sports club's football division, but kept the original name. In 1924, as part of the Reinliche Scheidung the football club and the sports club separated. After 14 May 1938, the SC Freiburg formed the football division of the FT 1844 again, under different legal conditions. The football club kept its own name. In 1952, following the dissolution and reformation of the FT 1844 following World War II, the football club became autonomous. The FT 1844 Freiburg has its own football division, which is active in youth football.

== Literature ==
- Ulrike Rödling, Heinz Siebold: Die „revolutionären" Turner. Die Rolle der Freiburger Turner in der Badischen Revolution. In: Schau-ins-Land, Heft 118, 1999, S. 187–194 online bei UB Freiburg
