= Struve Putsch =

Event in German 1848 revolution

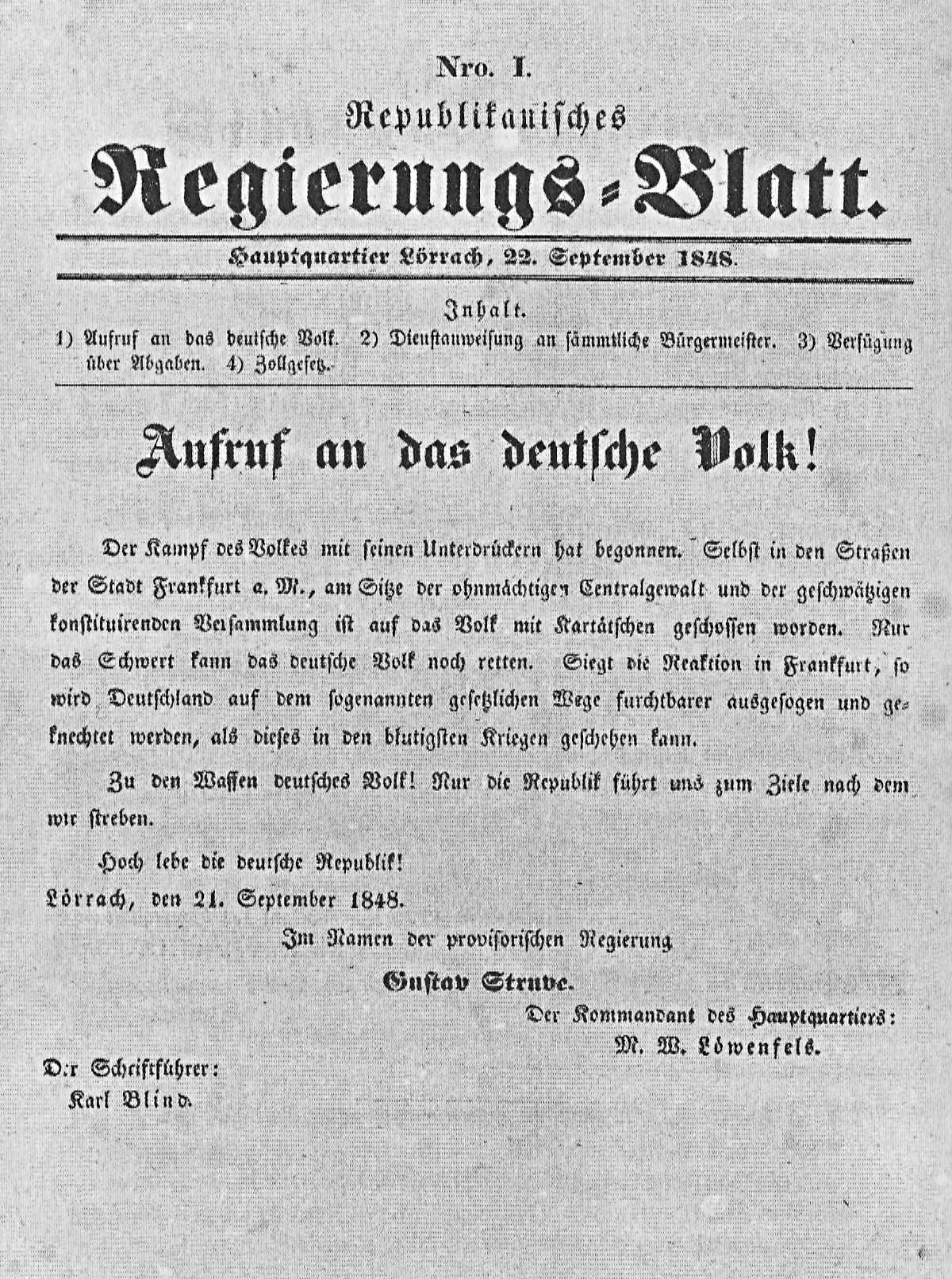
Republican government sheet No. 1 in the name of the "provisional government" of Gustav Struve

The Struve Putsch (German: Struve-Putsch), also known as the Second Baden Uprising (Zweiter badischer Aufstand) or Second Baden Rebellion (Zweite badische Schilderhebung), was a regional, South Baden element of the wider German Revolution of 1848/1849. It began with the proclamation of the German Republic on 21 September 1848 by Gustav Struve in Lörrach and ended with his arrest on 25 September 1848 in Wehr.

== Literature ==
- Gustav Struve: Geschichte der drei Volkserhebungen in Baden. Verlag von Jenni, Sohn, Berne, 1849. (amended reprint: Verlag Rombach, Freiburg i.Br. 1980, pp. 118–145)
- Moritz Wilhelm von Löwenfels, Friedrich Neff, G. Thielmann: Der zweite republikanische Aufstand in Baden : nebst einigen Enthüllungen über das Verbleiben der republikanischen Kassen. Basle, 1848, pp. 31–39. (online bei der Badischen Landesbibliothek)
- Theodor Mögling: Briefe an seine Freunde. Solothurn, 1858. (online at Google Books)
- Amalie Struve: Erinnerungen aus den badischen Freiheitskämpfen. Hamburg, 1850. (reprint in: Heftiges Feuer. Freiburg im Breisgau, Rombach, 1998, ISBN 3-7930-0877-0)
- Johann Baptist Bekk: Die Bewegung in Baden von Ende des Februar 1848 bis zur Mitte des Mai 1849. Mannheim 1850, pp. 183–200. (online at the Bavarian State Library)
- Paul Siegfried: Basel während des zweiten und dritten badischen Aufstandes 1848/49. 106. Neujahrsblatt der GGG. Basle, 1928.
- Eduard Kaiser: Aus alten Tagen. Lebenserinnerungen eines Markgräflers. Lörrach 1910. (new edition: Weil am Rhein 1981, pp. 258–266)
- Alfred Grosch: Der erste Schwurgerichtsfall in Baden, verhandelt zu Freiburg i. Br. vom 20. bis 30. März 1849. In: Schau-ins-Land, Vol. 41 (1914), pp. 95-108 online at UB Freiburg
- Emil Stärk: Rund um den Struve-Putsch vom September 1848 [Staufen]. In: Schau-ins-Land, Band 76 (1958), pp. 110-119online at UB Freiburg
