= Trefzger =

Trefzger is a German surname that belongs to a category of surnames that firstly originated as nicknames and were later assumed as hereditary surnames. The origin of this nickname is thought to lie in the Middle High German term "trefs", referring to a bramble, or a similar type of plant. One possible origin takes into account that the particular plant "trefs" referred to was nearly impossible to kill, therefore, in context of a person, a "trefs" would be someone who is very hardy and lives a long life.

== Early Trefzgers ==
Amongst early bearers of a variant of the surname Trefzger, a reference to "der (the) Trefs" of Hundgersingen near Riedlingen is dated on the year 1318. In 1389, a man by the name of Kunrad Treffesese was a church usherer in the town of Fauterbach.

== Trefzgers in Wehr ==
Most Trefzgers that have not yet emigrated to the US reside in the town of Wehr, Germany. In Wehr, the Trefzger family had a leading role in public life. Five Trefzgers were appointed ‘Vogte’, which means the old kind of landlord-mayor under the umbrella government of a King or a Duke, and later, two Trefzgers were elected ‘Burgermeister’, or mayor:

=== Landlord-Mayor ===
- Fridlin Trefzger (1699-1707)
- Josef Trefzger (1754)
- Michael Trefzger (1787-1791)
- Johann Baptist Trefzger (1806/08)
- Anton Trefzger (till 1820)

=== Mayor ===
- Johann Baptist Trefzger (1882-1884)*
- Adam Trefzger (1885-1909)

== Strife in Wehr ==
In the beginning of the 19th century there were 19 families with the name Trefzger in Wehr. The Trefzger family was the second largest in Wehr. In 1833, the law changed for servants, from being owned by landlords to now having a chance to buy their way out and be independent. In 1834, a commission of the mayor Berger and his council members (one of them was a Trefzger) worked out a plan for this matter. There was a problem, however, with Martin Trefzger. He was a teacher, city council secretary and one of the twelve landowners who had to be paid off accordingly. He and another landlord disagreed about how much the city should pay them at this buy-out. The fight between Trefzger and the commission came finally to an end in 1840. Enkendorf, part of Wehr, tried to secede from Wehr. Enkendorf claimed to have enough citizens (90) to receive its independence from Wehr (410 citizens). Against the independence of Enkendorf was the city council of Wehr, with members like Sebastian Trefzger and Karl Berger, as lawyers, and the scriptor (secretary) of law, Martin Trefzger.

== The Trefzgers in the World Wars ==
Died in World War I:

- Trefzger, Alois 1894-1915
- Trefzger, August 1887 – 1914
- Trefzger, Emil 1896-1916
- Trefzger, Franz Josef 1896-1917
- Trefzger, Julius 1895-1915
- Trefzger, Theodor Philipp 1898–1918
- Died in World War II:
- Trefzger, Emst 1917-1945 (seriously wounded)
- Trefzger, Gustav 1911-1942
- Trefzger, Hermann 1924-1945
- Trefzger, Hermann 1916-1940
- Trefzger, Karl Friedrich 1919-1943
- Trefzger, Otto 1918-1944 (never found)
- Trefzger, Otto 1918-1943
- Trefzger, Robert 1925-1944 (never found)
- Trefzger, Siegfried 1914-1940
- Trefzger, Walter 1925-1944
- Trefzger, Wolfgang 1913-1941
