= Baden Revolution =

1848-49 uprising in the Grand Duchy of Baden

The Baden Revolution (German: Badische Revolution) of 1848/1849 was a regional uprising in the Grand Duchy of Baden which was part of the revolutionary unrest that gripped almost all of Central Europe at that time.

As part of the popular liberal March Revolution in the states of the German Confederation, the revolution in the state of Baden was driven greatly by radical democratic influences: they were striving to create a Baden republic—subordinated to a greater Germany—under the sovereignty of the people, and aligned themselves against the ruling princes.

Their high points were the Hecker uprising in April 1848, the Struve Putsch of September 1848, and the rebellion as part of the Imperial Constitution campaign (Reichsverfassungskampagne) in May 1849 which assumed civil war-like proportions and was also known as the May Revolution. The rebellion ended on 23 July 1849 with the military defeat of the last revolt and the capture of Rastatt Fortress by German Federal Army troops under Prussian leadership.

== Historical overview ==
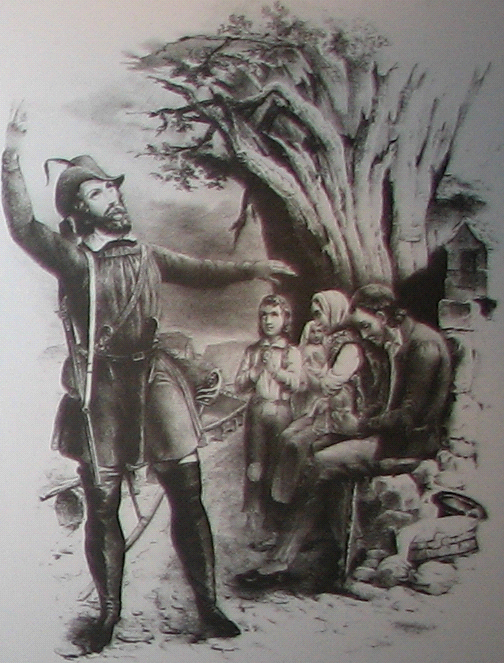
Stylised portrait of Friedrich Hecker (1811–1881), on the left

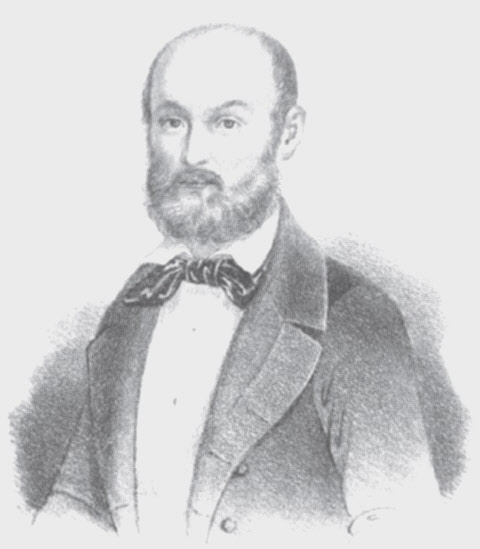
Gustav Struve

At the Hambach Festival of 1832 the signs of political upheaval, known as the Vormärz ("pre-March") were evident. Among the participants at the festival was Johann Philipp Becker. After the outbreak of the French Revolution of 1848 in Paris and the proclamation of the Second Republic in France, the revolutionary spark initially jumped to Baden before the other countries of the German Confederation gave way to revolutionary unrest and uprisings.

The German March revolution not only started in Baden, but also ended there when Rastatt Fortress, the last bastion of the revolutionaries, was captured by Prussian troops on 23 July 1849.

The Baden Revolution had two phases: between the beginning of March 1848 and September 1848 there were two attempts to form a republic in southwestern Germany: the Hecker Uprising and the rebellion led by Gustav Struve in Lörrach. With the defeat of Friedrich Hecker and his followers at Kandern and his flight into exile, and the arrest of Gustav Struve in September, this first phase ended.

The second phase began—after the rejection of the Constitution of St. Paul's Church by most of the royal houses of the German Parliament—with the May insurrections of 1849, not only in Baden, but also in other German states (especially in the Bavarian Rhenish Palatinate). They represented an attempt to enforce the constitution (the so-called Imperial Constitution Campaign). This second phase ended in Baden with the defeat of the rebels at the last battle in July 1849 in Rastatt.

Characteristic of the Baden Revolution, unlike other uprisings in the German Confederation, was the persistent demand for a democratic republic. By contrast, the revolutionary councils and parliaments of the other principalities of the Confederation favoured a constitutional and hereditary monarchy.

Radical democratic and early socialist revolutionaries were strongly represented in Baden. Some of the most prominent leaders were Friedrich Hecker, Gustav Struve and his wife Amalie, Gottfried Kinkel, Georg Herwegh and his wife Emma. Furthermore, Wilhelm Liebknecht, who at that time was relatively unknown but later co-founded the Social Democratic Workers' Party of Germany (SDAP), the predecessor party of SPD (the socialist party in Germany), participated in September 1848 in the uprising in Lörrach and in May 1849 in the Baden Revolution as Struve's adjutant.

The socialist Friedrich Engels who, during the March revolution wrote for the Neue Rheinische Zeitung published in Cologne by Karl Marx, also took an active part in 1849 in the final phase of the Baden Revolution in the fighting against counter-revolutionary Prussian troops. Finally, the married couple Fritz and Mathilde Franziska Anneke from Cologne joined the Baden rebels.

The basis of the revolution in Baden was based on the Volksvereine or popular associations.

The following table shows the connexion between the revolution in Baden, the events in the German Confederation and Europe.

Period	Grand Duchy of Baden	German Confederation	Europe
1847			
September	Offenburg Assembly		
October		Heppenheim Assembly	
November			Switzerland: Sonderbund War
1848	Baden Revolution	German revolutions	Italy: First Italian War of Independence (1848–1849); March 1848 to July 1849 Hungary: Hungarian Revolution/1849; March 1848 to August 1849
February	Mannheim Popular Assembly		France: French Revolution
March	Heidelberg Assembly	March Revolution Berlin: Barricade Uprising; March Revolution victims; Vienna: Revolutions in the Austrian Empire; Revolution in Sigmaringen	
April	Hecker Uprising Battle on the Scheideck; Battle of Günterstal; Storming of Freiburg; Battle of Dossenbach		
June		Pentecost Uprising in Prague	France: June Uprising and Counter-Revolution
September	Struve Putsch Battle of Staufen	Rebellion in Frankfurt	Slovakia: Slovak Uprising to November 1849
October		Vienna Uprising	
1849			
April		Storming of the Zeughaus in Prüm	
May	Baden Revolution (mutiny); to July 1849, Baden Revolutionary Government; Baden constitutional assembly; Battle of Waghäusel; Rastatt Fortress;	Reichsverfassungskampagne; Kaiser Deputation Dresden Uprising; Palatine Uprising; Iserlohn Uprising; Elberfeld Uprising	

== Chronology ==
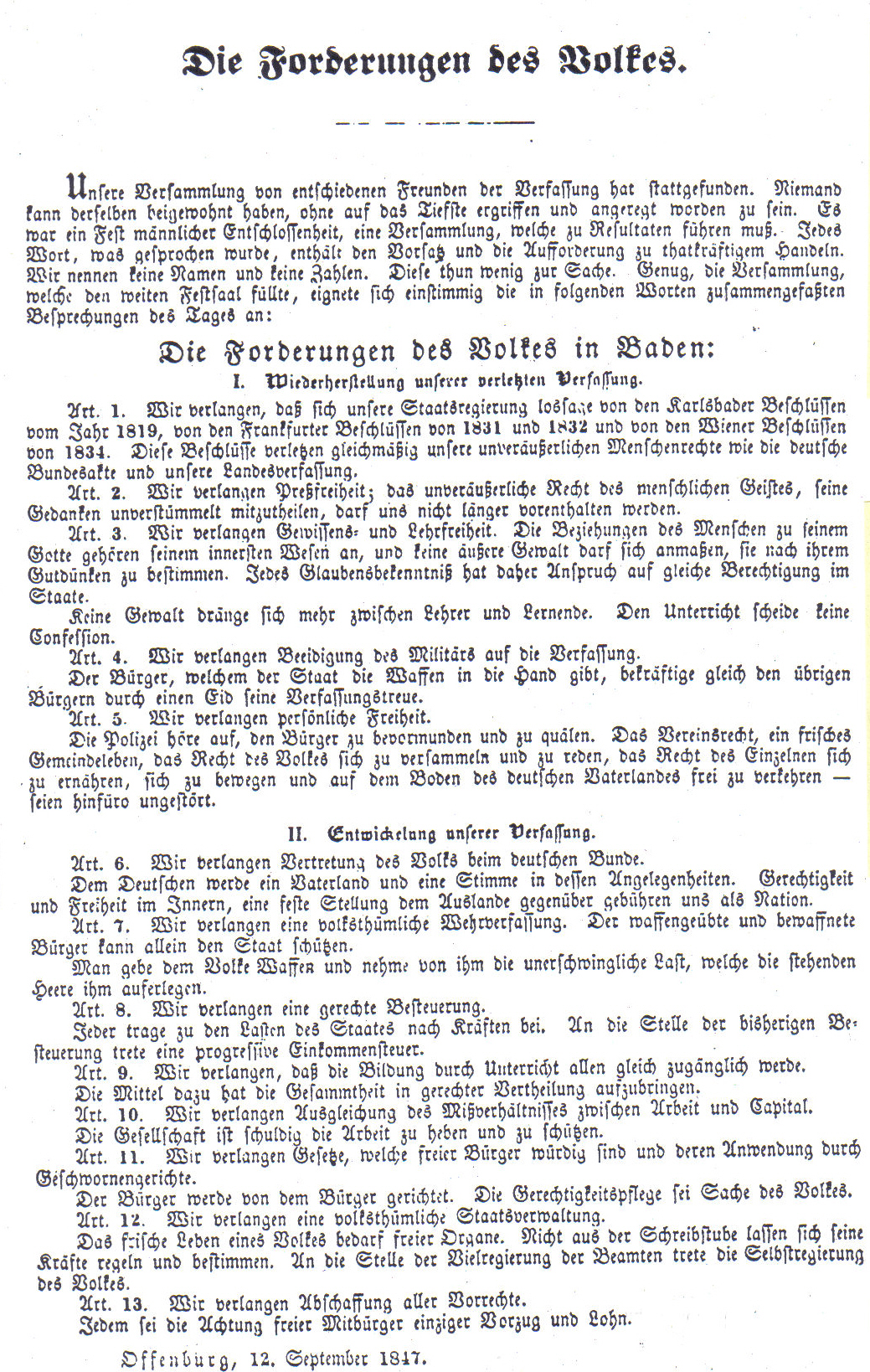
September 1847 flyer with the "demands of the people", which formulated the goals of the radical democrats at the Offenburg Assembly

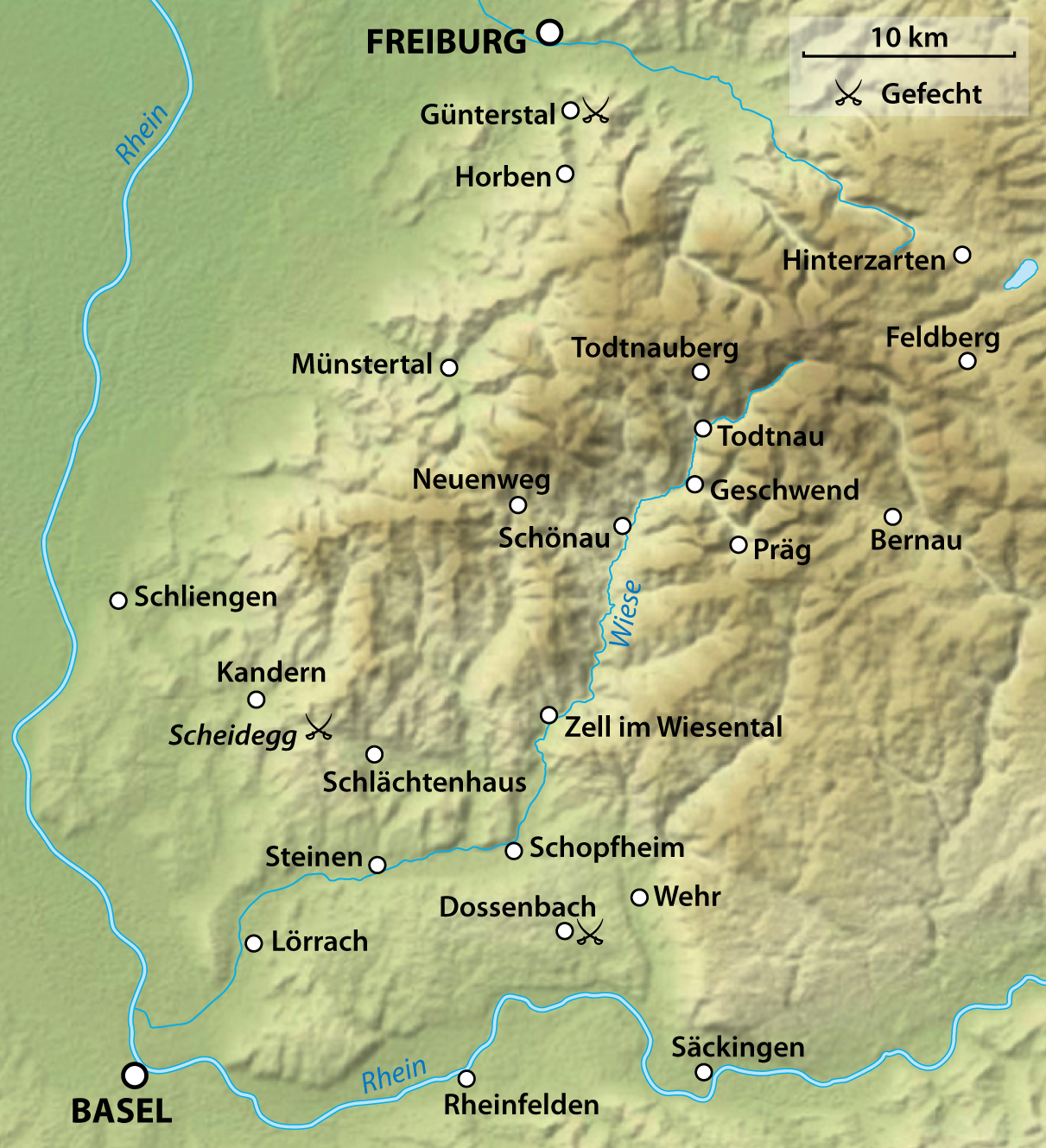
Map of the region affected by the April uprising of 1848

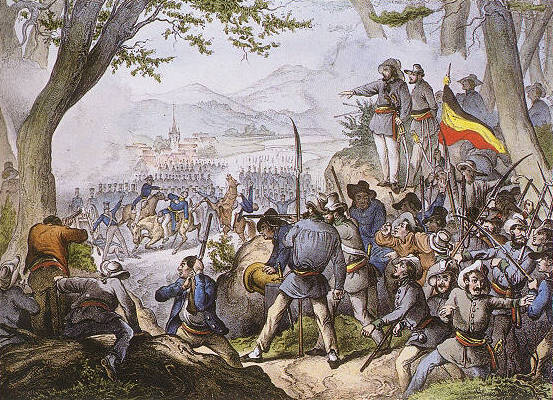
Contemporary lithograph, from the perspective of the revolutionaries, of the Battle of Kandern on 20 April 1848, at which the Hecker Uprising was put down

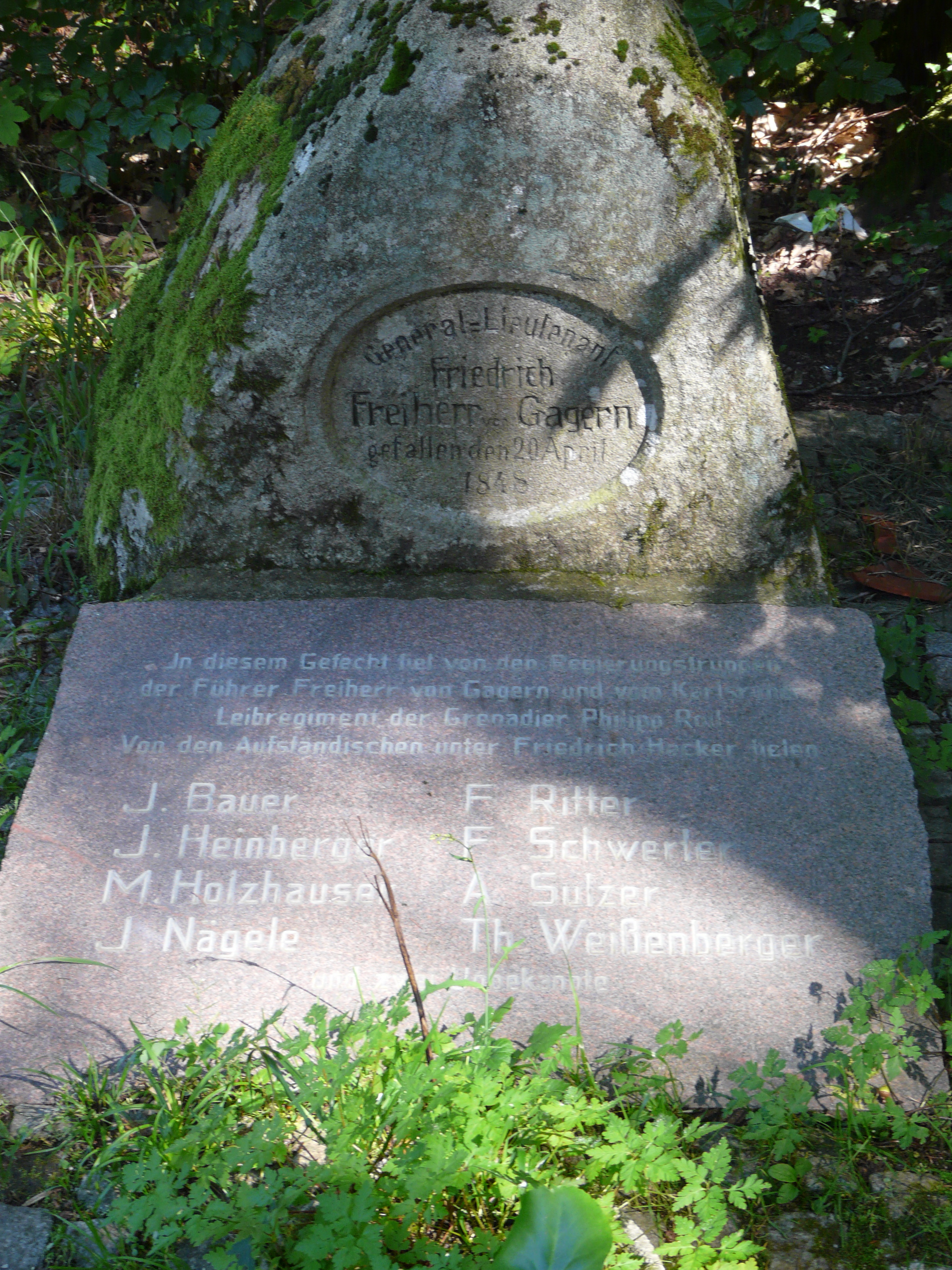
Monument at the Kandern Scheideck for General Friedrich von Gagern and the fallen soldiers and revolutionaries

- 12 September 1847: In the Offenburg Assembly of the key supporters of the constitution, Friedrich Hecker takes the 13 "demands of the people in Baden" for citizens' rights, social security and equality, which Gustav Struve consolidated into four "pressing demands of the deputations in Carlsruhe": 1. Arming of the people with open elections of officers. 2. Unrestricted press freedom. 3. Jury courts based on the English model. 4. Immediate formation of a German parliament.
- 27 February 1848: The Mannheim People's Assembly take up the 13 demands of the people again and send them as a petition to the Second Chamber of the Baden Landstände.
- 28 February 1848: In Freiburg in the house known as Zur Tannen, the gathering elects a people's committee, puts a catalogue of revolutionaries' demands together and sends it with a delegation to Karlsruhe. The delegation arrives at the state capital on 1 March.
- 1 March 1848: 20,000 men demonstrate in front of the Ständehaus of the parliament (Badische Ständeversammlung). Several demonstrators enter the building. Hecker demands the removal of the privileges of the nobility and the liberation of the peasants, thus removing the last vestiges of medieval feudalism.
- 2 March 1848: The First Chamber (Ständekammer) adopts a bill to abolish the remnants of feudalism, to make the army swear loyalty to the Baden Constitution and to establish religious equality for members of non-Christian faiths.
- 4 March 1848: Peasants' revolt in North Baden. The revolution spreads to other states in the German Confederation.
- 19 March 1848: Great People's Assembly in Offenburg which is attended by 20,000 people. Hecker and Struve speak to the crowd. They accuse the government of Baden of having indeed agreed to the 13 demands of the people of the past year in September in the wake of the popular movement in early March, but in delaying their implementation only wanting to win time to withdrawal of concessions again at the earliest opportunity.
- 26 March 1848: Karl von Rotteck junior opens a public meeting in Freiburg in the presence of Struve, where the organizers call for the safeguarding of personal liberty by a special law ("Habeas Corpus Act") and the complete separation of church and state. In the intoxication of enthusiasm, the assembly on the Münsterplatz approved a letter to the Prussian king, in which Struve criticises Frederick William's behaviour in the March days as a "royal actor and citizen killer".
- 12 April 1848: In Konstanz Hecker and Struve proclaim the republic and call on the people to take up arms in the name of a provisional government. The Hecker Uprising makes its way to the Rhine Plain where it intends to unite with a procession led by Georg Herwegh, the "German Democratic Legion" from France, in order to march on the state capital of Karlsruhe.
- 20 April 1848: Battle on the Scheideck. At Kandern in the Black Forest the rebels of the Hecker contingent are defeated and routed by Hessian troops. Friedrich Hecker flees into exile, initially in Switzerland and finally to the USA.
- 24 April 1848: Volunteers (Freischaren) under Franz Sigel march to Freiburg, which is occupied by rebels, in order to break through the ring of government troops. The relief operation fails. Instead, government forces storm the last barricade at the Swabian Gate and bring about a bloodbath among the volunteers.
- 27. April 1848: Herwegh's 900-strong "German Legion" is defeated at the Battle of Dossenbach by Württemberg infantry.
- 21 September 1848: At an uprising in Lörrach, under the cry of "Health, Education, Freedom for All!", Struve again proclaims a republic, but only gets as far as Staufen in his subsequent journey northwards. At the Battle for Staufen Bade troops defeat the rebels. Struve is apprehended a few days later (see Struve Putsch).
- 29 January 1849: In Freiburg Karl von Rotteck junior founds the Republican People's Union. As a counter-movement, on 18 February, his cousin, Mayor Joseph von Rotteck, and other constitutional liberals announce the founding assembly of a Fatherland Union, loyal to the sovereign. Both unions fight one another in a stubborn propaganda war.
- 20 March 1849: In Freiburg, the trial begins of Gustav Struve and Karl Blind in the Basler Hof before a jury court. Following their sentencing to eight years' imprisonment the criminals are taken to Rastatt Fortress.
- 14 April 1849: Baden becomes one of the original signatories to the Frankfurt Constitution.
- 9 May 1849: During the course of the May uprisings of 1849, by which people attempt to enforce the recognition of the changes to the imperial constitution brought about by the revolution in the individual states of the German Confederation, soldiers of the Baden Army garrison in the federal fortress at Rastatt mutiny and fraternize with some of the revolutionary vigilantes in a "show of loyalty and love for the people".
- 11 May 1849: Fraternization of Republicans with the 2nd Baden Infantry Regiment in Freiburg
- 12/13 May 1849: At the delegate's conference of the Baden People's Unions in Freiburg Amand Goegg asks "the question about the proclamation of the republic" but finds no support.
- 13 May 1849: A people's assembly in Offenburg agrees a 16-point programme, which inter alia demands the unconditional recognition of the imperial constitution and the formation of a new—albeit still grand ducal—government under the liberal politician, Lorenz Brentano. The official grand ducal government refuses the demands of the Offenburg Assembly. On the evening of 13 May the revolutionary state committee of people's unions drives to Rastatt, where Amand Goegg announces the Offenburg agreement from the balcony of the town hall and Brentano swears in militia and soldiers to the imperial constitution. That same night of 13/14 May Grand Duke Leopold flees from his residenz in Karlsruhe into exile at Koblenz.
- 14 May 1849: The Hoffmann / Bekk Ministry is declared dismissed and an Executive Commission of the State Committee, which initially takes over the government business in the absence of the grand ducal government which has fled, establishes itself with Amand Goegg, Joseph Ignatz Peter and Carl Joseph Eichfeldt under their president, Lorenz Brentano.
- May 1849: Johann Philipp Becker is tasked with the creation and organisation of the Volkswehr militia. His first order of the day is dated 21 May.
- 30 May 1849: A battle takes place between the Volkswehr and Hessian troops near Heppenheim.
- 1 June 1849: Under Lorenz Brentano a provisional democratic government is formed, in which the conservative-liberal forces dominate; the state committee disbands itself.
- 3 June 1849: The men of Baden eligible to vote agree to the Electoral Code of the German National Assembly on the composition of a constituent national assembly. However, the Baden Constituent Assembly of 1849 only lasted from 10 June to 30 June 1849.
- 5 June 1849: In Karlsruhe, a "Club of Resolute Progress" ('Klub des entschiedenen Fortschritts) forms under the leadership of Struve, now released, and Becker and demands from the government decisive revolutionary measures. The delegation had them arrested by the delegation, but they had to be released under pressure from the volunteers stationed in the town.
- June 1849: The Polish revolutionary, Ludwik Mierosławski, is appointed as General of the Revolution Army. German Federal Army troops under the command of Lieutenant General Eduard von Peucker and two improvised Prussian army corps under the Prince of Prussia as well as a Hessian contingent of troops under Friedrich Ferdinand Wilhelm von Schäffer-Bernstein invade Baden, in order to defeat the revolution.
- 15/16 June 1849: Baden forces win battles on the line of the River Neckar at Mannheim, Käferthal, Ladenburg and Hirschhorn
- 20 June 1849: After ousting the revolutionary troops, the First Prussian Corps under Moritz von Hirschfeld leaves the Palatinate over the Rhine near Germersheim
- 21/22 June 1849: Hirschfeld gains victory in the Battle of Waghäusel forcing the Baden troops to retreat in order to escape being surrounded.
- 25 June 1849: Battle of Durlach, at which Becker's Volkswehr cover the withdrawal of the army at the line of the Murg. The revolutionary government flees to Freiburg im Breisgau and with it, the revolutionary troops.
- 28 June 1849: The constitutional assembly meets in the Basler Hof at Freiburg. At the direction of Struves they agree to continue the war against "the enemies of German unity and freedom" with all means at their disposal. Whereupon Brentano stands down as head of the government and Amand Goegg together with Minister of War, Werner, form the "provisional government of Baden with dictatorial powers“.

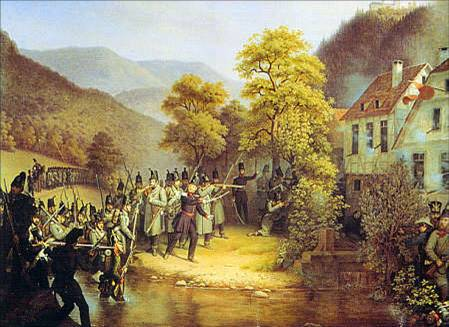
Franz Seraph Stirnbrand (1788–1882): Battle in Gernsbach on 29 June 1849

- 29/30 June 1849: Bloody fighting on the Murg at the Battle of Gernsbach on 29 June. Ludwik Mierosławski appoints Major Gustav Tiedemann from Struve's circle as Governor of Rastatt Fortress. Revolutionary units withdraw to South Baden. The Second Prussian Corps under Karl von der Groeben destroys Rastatt.
- 1 July 1849: A final contingent of about 4,000 men marches past to the representatives of the revolutionary government and their supreme commander, Franz Sigel in Freiburg.
- 7 July 1849: The Prussians march into Freiburg unopposed.
- 9 July 1849 The citizen's militia (Bürgerwehr) of Sipplingen arrest insurgents in Bodman and transfer them to Pfullendorf.
- 12 July 1849 Revolutionary troops cross the border into Switzerland at Baltersweil and Konstanz and ask for asylum.
- 23 July 1849: After being surrounded for three weeks Rastaat surrenders to Groeben. The Governor of Rastatt becomes the Prussian general, Heinrich von Holleben.

The revolution had failed. The Baden Army was disbanded and later rebuilt under Prussian leadership. Many of the rebels escaped into exile including Struve, Brentano, Carl Schurz, Friedrich Engels and Friedrich Beust; others were arrested and brought before courts martial with Prussian and Baden boards. Following the fall of Rastatt, the Prussian commander, Karl Alois Fickler, the brother of Baden agitator, Joseph Fickler, was charged with the defence of the accused. The courts sentenced 27 rebels to death by firing squad (including the last fortress commandant of Rastatt, Gustav Tiedemann) and pronounced long goal sentences in Prussian prisons against other revolutionaries. In the casemates of Rastatt, where many revolutionaries were held prisoner, typhoid fever broke out and caused many deaths.

== Revolutionaries executed by court martial ==
From 27 July to 27 October 1849, courts martial took place in Mannheim, Rastatt and Freiburg. A total of 27 death sentences were pronounced and carried out – four other death sentences were not carried out.

=== In Rastatt ===
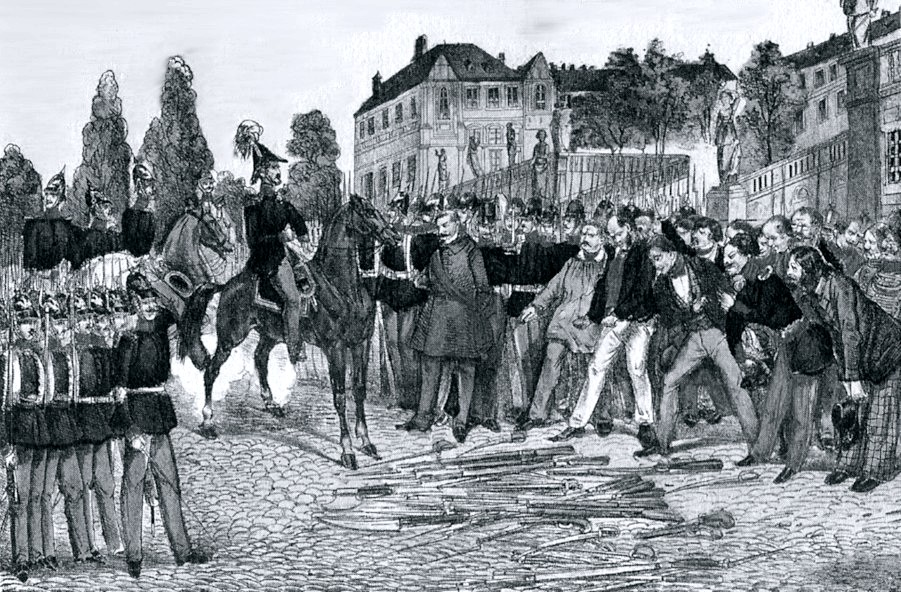
Surrender of the revolutionary garrison of Rastatt to the troops of the German Confederation on 23 July 1849

In Rastatt, 19 death sentences were pronounced. Otto von Corvin, who had also been given the death sentence, was reprieved and his sentence commuted to imprisonment.

- Gottfried Bauer (d. 4 October 1849) – private soldier, Gissigheim
- Karl Bernigau (d. 20 October 1849) – major, Mühlhausen
- Ernst Gustav von Biedenfeld (d. 9 August 1849) – battalion commander, Bühl
- Georg Böhning (d. 17 August 1849) – clockmaker, commander of the refugee legion, finished as colonel, Wiesbaden
- Andreas Counis (d. 15 September 1849) – private soldier, Pforzheim
- Ernst Elsenhans (d. 7 August 1849) – publisher, Feuerbach
- Josef Günthard (d. 22 September 1849) – private soldier, Konstanz
- Konrad Heilig (d. 11 August 1849) – former Baden NCO, finished as major and commander of the fortress artillery at Rastatt, Pfullendorf
- Karl Jakobi (d. 3 September 1849) – major of the labour battalion, Mannheim
- Peter Jäger (d. 22 September 1849) – private soldier, Assamstadt
- Jean Josef Jansen (d. 20 October 1849) – surveyor, Cologne
- Josef Kilmarx (d. 8 October 1849) – sergeant, Rastatt
- Ludwig Kohlenbecker (d. 8 October 1849) – private soldier, Karlsruhe
- Konrad Lenzinger (d. 25 August 1849) – corporal, Durlach
- Theophil Mniewski (d. 25 August 1849) – Polish officer, Wodzierady (Russian Poland)
- Ludwig Peter Wilhelm Schade (d. 12 September 1849) – lieutenant, Karlsruhe
- Friedrich Wilhelm Schrader (d. 20 October 1849) – deserter from the 8th Prussian Artillery Brigade, Mansfeld
- Gustav Nikolaus Tiedemann (d. 11 August 1849) – former Baden dragoon lieutenant, finished as colonel and commander of Rastatt Fortress, Landshut
- Philipp Zenthöfer (d. 25 August 1849) – gunsmith and private soldier, Mannheim

=== In Freiburg ===
Following court martial-like proceedings three revolutionaries were sentenced to death in 1849 in Freiburg and executed by firing squad at Wiehre Cemetery on the dates shown:

- Johann Maximilian Dortu: Prussian NCO, during the revolution major in the Baden Volkswehr – sentenced on 11 July by the military court; d. 31 July
- Friedrich Neff: student of philosophy, participant in the uprisings led by Hecker and Struve; d. 9 August
- Gebhard Kromer: corporal in the Baden revolutionary army; d. 21 August

=== In Mannheim ===
In Mannheim five death sentences were pronounced. Theodor Mögling, who was also sentenced to death in Mannheim, was reprieved and his sentence commuted to a term of imprisonment. The Mannheim court martial issued jail sentences of 10 years in 15 other cases.

- Karl Höfer (d. 16 August 1849): teacher, Brehmen/Altneudorf
- Valentin Streuber (d. 11 October 1849)
- Adolf von Trützschler (d. 14 August 1849)
- Peter Lacher (d. 28. August 1849)
- Gottlieb Heinrich Dietz (d. 20 August 1849)

== In popular culture ==
=== Theatre ===
- The Geschichtstheatergesellschaft On 4 July 1998 Stuttgart acknowledged the Baden revolutionaries in a performance in period uniforms and with historical props for the 125th anniversary of the address by Friedrich Hecker on 4 July 1873.

=== Film ===
- The Lenz Papers. Four-part TV film. Revolutionary drama about the Baden Revolution of 1849. After the eponymous translation of the original English historic novel by Stefan Heym. Bundesrepublik Deutschland, 1986, 4 × 90 min., directed by: Dieter Berner.

== See also ==
- Enno Sander (in German)
- Otto von Corvin
