= Amalie Struve =

German author (1824–1862)

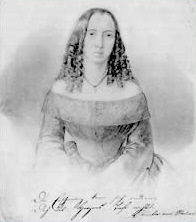

Amalie Struve (born Amalie Siegrist, after her adoption by her step father Amalie Düsar: 2 October 1824 – 13 February 1862) was a democratic radical participant in the 1848 March Revolution. She is also remembered as an early feminist and author.

== Life ==
=== Provenance and early years ===
Elise Ferdinandine Amalie Siegrist was born in Mannheim, the city at the confluence to the rivers Rhine and Neckar. Her mother, Elisabeth Siegrist and her father, the army officer Alexander von Sickingen, were not married to each other. After her mother married, however, in 1827 Amalie was adopted by her new step father, a languages teacher called Friedrich Düsar. He saw to it that Amalie and her younger brother Pedro received a sound education, as a result of which she was later able to support her family, when necessary, by working as a languages teacher. Because of her adoption she is sometimes identified in sources as Amalie Düsar. The Düsar family were not wealthy, and by the time she was 21 Amalie had already started working as a teacher of French and German.

=== Marriage ===
On 16 November 1845 Amalie Düsar married the lawyer and political activist Gustav Struve. Struve's father, Johann Christoph Gustav von Struve was a diplomat and minor aristocrat in the service of the Russian Empire. Marriage to Amalie, who was not from an aristocratic family, nor even legitimate, displeased Gustav's family. The marriage itself nevertheless appears to have been an exceptionally harmonious and happy one. In 1846, reflecting their political beliefs, Gustav and Amalie Struve also rejected their Protestant confession, becoming so-called "German catholics". The German Catholics were a sect that flourished (briefly) during the 1840s and 1850s as a reaction against religiously cloaked dogmatism. Many adherents were also involved politically in the radical activism that was a feature of the 1840s. In 1847 Gustav Struve took the further step of renouncing his own title: Gustav Karl Johann Christian von Struve became Gustav Struve.

Amalie Sruve first came to prominence as the wife of Gustav Struve, at his side in the struggle and agitation that were part of the March Revolution during 1848 in Baden.

=== 1848/49 ===
The "February Revolution" which triggered the French king's abdication also sparked a series of uprisings in the component states of the German Confederation. During the "March Revolution" the insurgents called for German unity in response to what many of the more politically conscious saw as illiberal policies applied by local rulers taking their lead from Vienna. In Baden there were calls for a republic from revolutionary leaders such as Friedrich Hecker and Gustav Struve which resonated powerfully with the Volksverein loosely, "popular associations". From the outset, Amalie participated actively in the action alongside her husband. She was present at the so-called "Heckerzug" (uprising) in which, on 20 April 1848, an armed civilian militia was convincingly defeated and destroyed by regular troops of the German Confederation at Kandern. Amalie and Gustav Struve survived, and with Friedrich Hecker initially escaped to the relative safety of Switzerland. However, in September 1848 the Struve's crossed back into Baden at Lörrach, where they tried again to proclaim a republic in the so-called "Struve-Putsch". Their insurrection ended in failure after just three days. On this and other occasions Amalie Struve was particularly focused on inspiring and mobilising women in support of the 1848 revolutionary ideals.

After the uprising had been put down at the "Battle" of Staufen, by troops under by General Friedrich Hoffmann, both Gustav and Amalie Struve were sentenced to prison terms, at separate trials. They spent the eight months between September 1848 and April 1849 imprisoned in Freiburg. Amalie was held in solitary confinement, but she was able to write sketches about the French revolutionary hero 'Manon' Roland whom she idolised. A few years later, in 1851, she published a piece based on these sketches entitled "Eine Republikanerin" in a literary journal called "Deutescher Zuschauer". By this time her own involvement in the "Heckerzug" (uprising) and subsequent actions meant that she, too, was becoming something of a celebrity in revolutionary circles. As soon as she was released from the prison-fort in Freiburg, Amalie Struve returned to agitating for an insurrection. By this time the cause for the revolutionaries had become the "Reichsverfassungskampagne" ("Imperial Constitution campaign"), now that the "Frankfurt Constitution" put together by the democratically elected Frankfurt Parliament had been rejected by the two most powerful German states, Prussia and Austria, and the idealistically driven optimism that had characterised the outbreak of the March Revolution just over a year earlier had turned out to be misplaced. In some of the middle-ranking German states, including Saxony and Baden, this led to the so-called May [1849] insurrection, in which the activists urged acceptance of the "Frankfurt Constitution" by individual states, even if its adoption across the German Confederation as a whole could not be accomplished. Amalie Struve played her full part, notably in the desecration on 11 May 1849 of the garrison in the fortress at Rastatt. During the ensuing uprising her husband was released from custody on 12 May 1849 during a confused episode which involved a "political demonstration" turning up outside the prison in which he was being detained and a badly frightened prison guard. On 14 May 1849 the Grand Duke fled. On 1 June 1849 a republic was proclaimed, with a provisional government led by the left-wing liberal politician Lorenzo Brentano. In order to defeat the republican uprising, Prussian troops advanced on Baden. Brentano was keen (like the temporarily absent the Grand Duke) to avoid bloodshed and to progress the revolution's democratic objectives through negotiation. He delayed arming a popular militia only to be overthrown by Struve and other radicals. Amalie Struve participated in the fierce fighting against the battle-hardened Prussian troops that followed, but the battle was completely uneven and the last of the revolutionaries were blockaded into the walled fortress of Raststatt and forced to surrender on 23 July 1949. As it would have seemed at the time, that really did mark the end of the March Revolution.

=== Aftermath of a failed revolution ===
Many of the revolutionaries were exiled or sentenced to long jail terms. Some of the movement's most prominent leaders, including Friedrich Hecker, along with Gustav and Amalie Struve, managed instead to move abroad via, initially, Switzerland. They were quickly expelled and moved on to France. In France, according to a remark in a letter written by Gustav Struve, they found the police surveillance intolerable and they moved again. During this time a number of the failed revolutionaries of 1848 1848/49, finding themselves still under pressure on the European mainland, were making their way to London. Most famously Karl Marx, the publication of The Communist Manifesto having passed largely unnoticed the previous year, settled in London in June or (more probably: but sources differ) August 1849. Other German revolutionaries, including the Struves, must have arrived in London at about the same time. Certainly by the time Amalie Struve completed and published her "Erinnerungen aus den badischen Freiheitskämpfen" ("Memories from the Baden Liberation Struggles"), she did so from London where, according to sources, it had also been written. Although the book was published (in Hamburg) only in 1850, the first line printed at the head of the main text reads, "London, den 12. Oktober 1849".

=== New World ===
There are signs of tensions surfacing between the German political exiles in London during 1850 and 1851, but the more acute difficulties for the Struves were economic. Karl Marx had found himself a wealthy sponsor and had taken the further precaution, while still in Germany, of marrying an heiress. In contrast, without any secure source of income ("...ohne sichere Erwerbsquelle"), the Struves felt themselves forced to leave London in favour of New York. Although the employment prospects for an ex-revolutionary might not have appeared too encouraging, there was already, in the United States a lively market for German-language newspapers from which work might be expected. On 11 April 1851 Gustav and Amalie Struve set sail from Liverpool aboard the sailing ship "Roscius". They arrived in New York precisely one month later. They became part of the "Forty-Eighter" class, men and women who had participated in the unsuccessful (in the immediate term) 1848 March Revolution, and who arrived in the "New World" with a shared political engagement and a commitment to democratic ideals.

In their new homeland Amalie Struve became an author. Some of what she wrote was clearly aimed at supporting the American feminist movement. She wrote novels and articles covering voting rights for women as well as education and training for girls and women. She wrote about the fates of emigrant families in the United States. Another theme she tackled involved comparing the Baden Revolution with the French Revolution of 1789, which many people still saw as a something of a template for any effective political uprising. She also wrote about the ways in which the Protestant Reformation had unfolded and continued to resonate differently in France, England and Germany.

Amalie Struve died on Staten Island (NY) in 1862, still aged only 37, as a result of complications following the birth of her third daughter. Her brother, Pedro Friedrich Dusar (1828-1901), also left Germany. He settled in Britain during the early 1850s, working initially as a typesetter in London and then as a lecturer at King's College, Aberdeen between 1854 and 1858. He was employed as a "senior German master" at Cheltenham College between 1859 and 1890.

== Output (selection) ==
- Historische Zeitbilder. I. Westminster. Franz Schlodtmann, Bremen 1850 Digitalisat
- Historische Zeitbilder.II. Heloise Desfleurs. Franz Schlodtmann, Bremen 1850 Digitalisat
- Historische Zeitbilder. III. Der Fall von Magdeburg. Franz Schlodtmann, Bremen 1850 Digitalisat
- Erinnerungen aus den badischen Freiheitskämpfen. Den deutschen Frauen gewidmet. Hoffmann und Campe, Hamburg 1850 Digitalisat
- Eine Proletarierin. Roman aus der Revolutionszeit. In: Sociale Republik. Organ der freien Arbeiter. New York 1858 Nr. 1–20
- Die Tochter des Gefängniswärters. In: Sociale Republik. Organ der freien Arbeiter. New York 1859
- Monica Marcello-Müller (editor-producer): Frauenrechte sind Menschenrechte! Schriften der Revolutionärin und Literatin Amalie Struve. Centaurus-Verlag Herbolzheim 2002 ISBN 3-8255-0341-0 (Frauen in Geschichte und Gesellschaft. produced by Annette Kuhn & Valentine Rothe, vol 37)
