= Battle on the Scheideck =

Coordinates: 47°41′28.5″N 7°44′7.7″E

Battle at the Scheideck
- Part of Baden Revolution
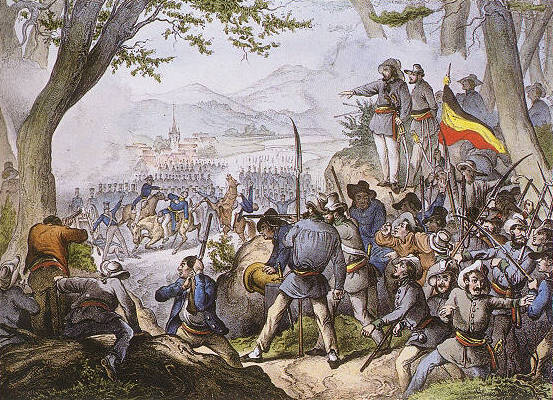
- Contemporary lithograph of the battle
| Date | 20 April 1848 |
| Location | Scheideck near Kandern |
| Result | Victory to the Baden and Hessian federal troops |

Belligerents
| Freischärler (rebel volunteers) | Grand Duchy of Baden; Grand Duchy of Hesse |

Commanders and leaders
| Friedrich Hecker | General Friedrich von Gagern †; Colonel Heinrich Wilhelm von Hinckeldey |

Strength
| 1,200 | 2,200 |

Casualties and losses
| 10 dead | 4 dead; 15 wounded; 6 missing |

The Battle on the Scheideck (German: Gefecht auf der Scheideck or Scheidegg), also known as the Battle of Kandern (Gefecht bei Kandern) took place on 20 April 1848 during the Baden Revolution on the Scheideck Pass southeast of Kandern in south Baden in what is now southwest Germany. Friedrich Hecker's Baden band of revolutionaries encountered troops of the German Confederation under the command of General Friedrich von Gagern. After several negotiations and some skirmishing a short battle ensued on the Scheideck, in which von Gagern fell and the rebels were scattered. The German Federal Army took up the pursuit and dispersed a second revolutionary force that same day under the leadership of Joseph Weißhaar. The Battle on the Scheideck was the end of the road for the two rebel forces. After the battle, there were disputes over the circumstances of von Gagern's death.

== Literature ==
- Das Gefecht bei Kandern und Tod des Generallieutenants von Gagern am 20. April. Nach neuen, bisher unveröffentlichten Aktenstücken. Verlag Franz Nöldeke, Karlsruhe, 1848. Online at Google Books. Collections of reports and correspondence on the battle may be found in various sources including:
  - Friedrich Hecker: Erklärung des Dr. Hecker vom 12. Mai 1848
  - Heinrich Wilhelm von Hinckeldey: Bericht an das Kriegsministerium über das Gefecht der großherzoglich badischen und großherzoglich hessischen Truppen gegen die Rebellen bei Kandern am 20. April 1848
  - Bericht des den Truppen im Oberland als Civilkommissär beigegebenen Regierungsrath Stephani, von Lörrach den 20. April 1848
- Frank Engehausen: Kleine Geschichte der Revolution 1848/49 in Baden, G. Braun Buchverlag, Karlsruhe, 2010, ISBN 978-3765085963.
- Sabine Freitag: Friedrich Hecker. Biographie eines Republikaners, Franz Steiner, Stuttgart, 1998. ISBN 3-515-07296-9.
- Angelika Hauser-Hauswirth (Redaktion): Wege der Revolutionäre. Wanderrouten Deutsche Revolution in Baden 1848/49, LpB Baden-Württemberg, 1998.
- Friedrich Hecker: Die Erhebung des Volkes in Baden für die deutsche Republik im Frühjahr 1848, Schabelitz, Basle, 1848. online verfügbar durch die Badische Landesbibliothek Uniform Resource Name nbn:de:bsz:31-12120.
- Wolfgang J. Mommsen: 1848. Die ungewollte Revolution, Fischer Taschenbuch, Frankfurt, 2000. ISBN 3-596-13899-X.
- Karl Morell: Die März-Revolution und der badische Aufstand. 2., umgearbeitete Auflage, Scheitlin und Zollikofer, St. Gallen 1849. Online at Google Books
- Gustav Struve: Geschichte der drei Volkserhebungen in Baden, Jenni, Berne, 1849. Online at Google Books
- Veit Valentin: Geschichte der deutschen Revolution von 1848–1849. Band 1: Bis zum Zusammentritt des Frankfurter Parlaments., reprint, Kiepenheuer und Witsch, Cologne and Berlin, 1970
