= Max Dortu =

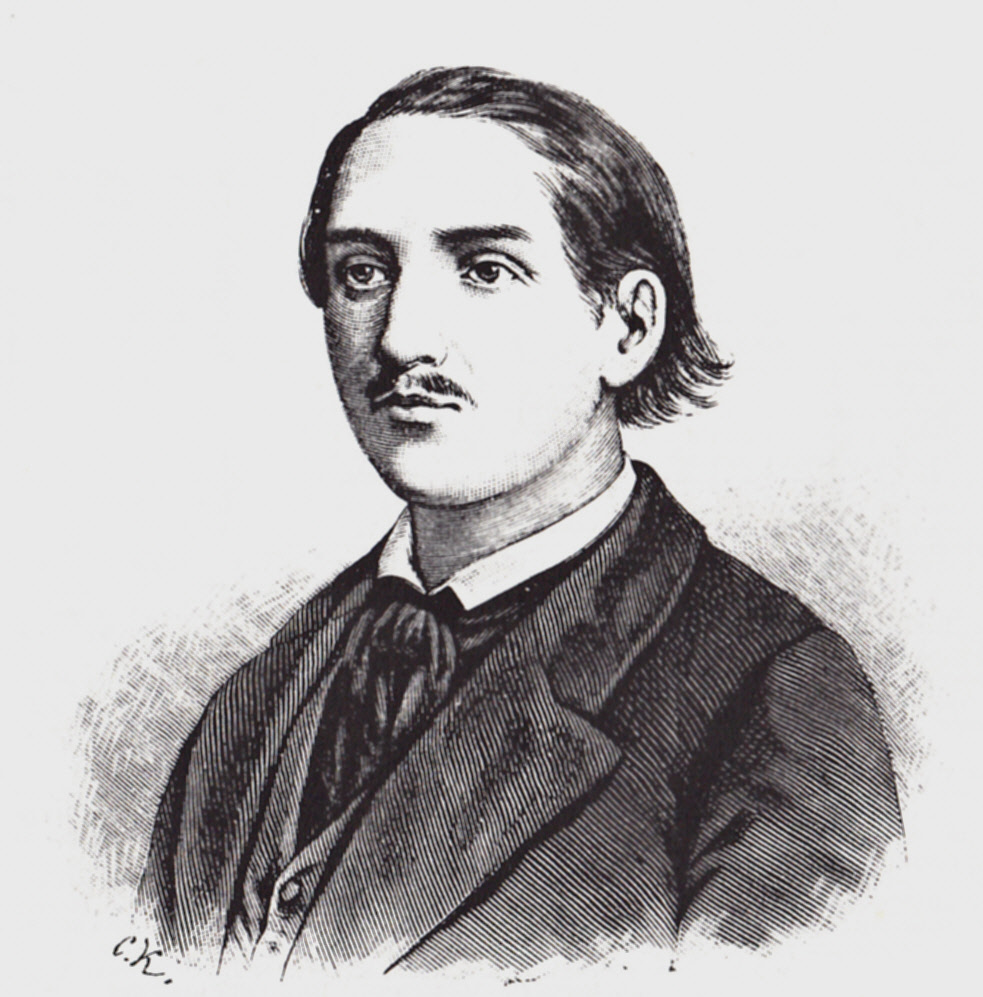
Max Dortu

Max Dortu (1826–1849) was a German-born revolutionary democrat. He took part in the Berlin uprising of March 18, 1848 and participated in the Baden-Palatinate uprising of 1849. Following the suppression of the uprisings, the Prussian intervention forces in Baden eventually captured Dortu in Freiburg. He was tried by court martial and executed by a firing squad.

== See also ==
- Revolutions of 1848
