= Freischar =

German name given to an irregular, volunteer military unit

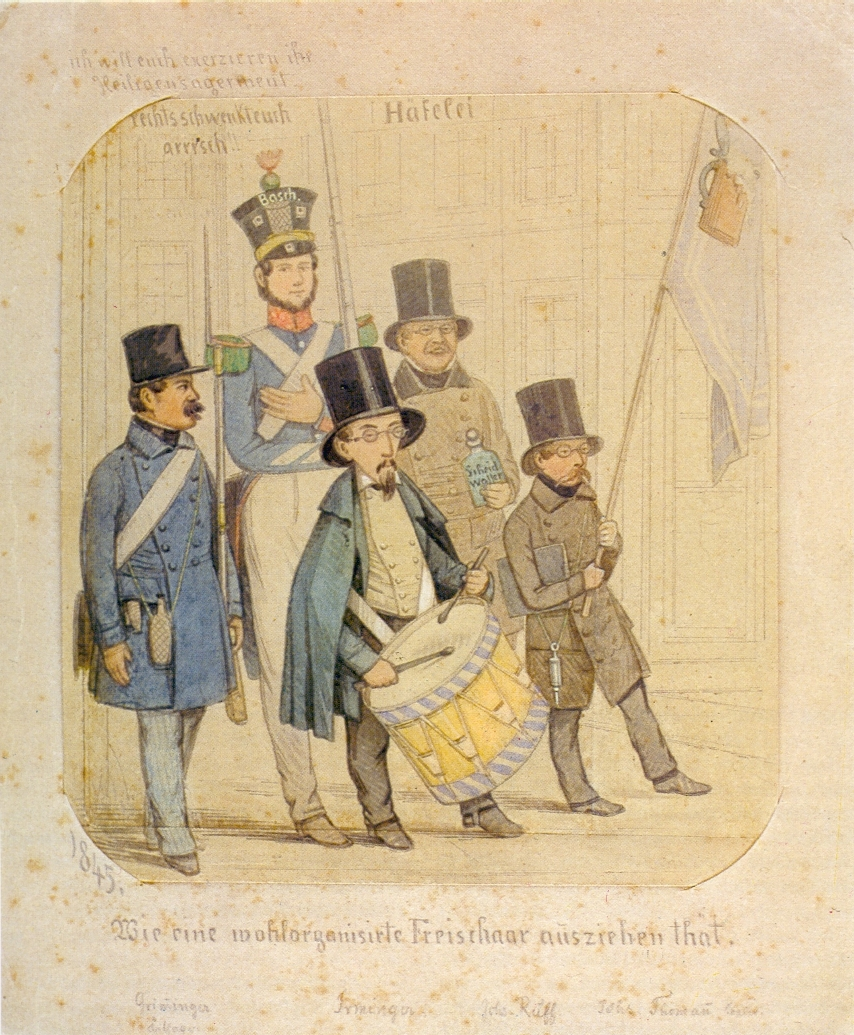
Swiss Freischärlers with Gottfried Keller as drummer. 1845 caricature by Johannes Ruff

The Freischar (German: [ˈfʁaɪ̯ˌʃaːɐ̯]) was the German name given to an irregular, volunteer military unit that, unlike regular or reserve military forces, participated in a war without the formal authorisation of one of the belligerents, but on the instigation of a political party or an individual. A Freischar deployed against a foreign enemy was often called a Freikorps. The term Freischar has been commonly used in German-speaking Europe since 1848. The members of a Freischar were called Freischärler (German: [ˈfʁaɪ̯ˌʃɛːɐ̯lɐ]). As early as 1785 Johann von Ewald published in Kassel his Essay on Partisan Warfare (German: Abhandlung über den kleinen Krieg), which described his experiences with the rebels in the North American colonies.

== Legal status ==
The Hague Convention of 1907 distinguished between militia, volunteer corps and members of the regular armed forces. According to the then ruling legal principle, volunteers did not have to be brought before a court. They could be sentenced by a court martial and executed. A historic example is the execution of the officers of the Freischar of Ferdinand von Schill in 1809.

This legal situation changed with the signing of the Geneva Convention. Freischärler were given combatant status if they had an organisational structure, a fixed distinctive emblem recognizable at a distance, carried arms openly and conducted their operations in accordance with the laws and customs of war. They also had a right to humane treatment and a fair trial.

== Historic examples ==
Freischaren were deployed:

- in the 17th century, known as snapphanes (Danish: Snaphaner) in the former Danish regions of present-day southern Sweden against the Royal Swedish Army, especially in the Scanian War
- as German volunteer units against Napoleon in 1813, where they were classed as Freikorps,
- in the Freischar campaigns of 1844 and 1845 that led in 1847 to the Sonderbund War in Switzerland
- as the Academic Legion in the revolutions of 1848 in the Austrian Empire
- in the German revolutions of 1848–49
- in the First Schleswig War against Denmark
- in the Expedition of the Thousand to conquer Sicily and Naples

In conservative circles the term was often used in a hostile and derogatory fashion, but it achieved great popularity in 1848. There was even a cultural magazine, Der Freischärler.

=== Republican Freischars in the March Revolution of 1848–49 ===
Units and formations of republican Freischars in the Baden Revolution of April 1848:

- Hecker unit: established on 12 April 1848 in Konstanz under the command of Friedrich Hecker; initially just 53 men strong, after merging with other Freischärler from Donaueschingen, the Hecker unit grew to 1,000 men. It was defeated on 20 April 1848 in the Battle on the Scheideck.
- Sigel Column; established on 15 April 1848 in Konstanz under the command of Franz Sigel from members of the Konstanz militia; 3,000 men.
- Hochrhein Column; established by 17 April 1848 in Lottstetten under the leadership of Gustav Struve and Joseph Weißhaar; 3,000 men.
- German Democratic Legion: Freischärler unit established in Alsace and in Paris under the command of the poet Georg Herwegh; composed chiefly of German migrant workers and republican exiles; crossed the Rhine on 24 April 1848; defeated on 27 April 1848; around 800 men.

== See also ==
- Deutsche Freischar — federation of Wandervögel and Pfadfinder hiking groups
- Deutsche Akademische Freischar — student reform body before the First World War
- Francs-tireur
- Partisan
- Guerrilla
- Death squad
