= Schwabentor =

Coordinates: 47°59′34″N 7°51′15″E

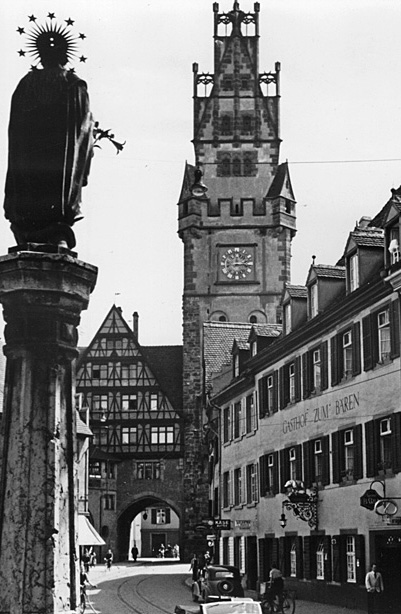
The gate in 1936

The Schwabentor (English Swabian Gate), also called Obertor in the Middle Ages, is the more recent of the two remaining city gates of the medieval defensive wall of Freiburg im Breisgau in Baden-Württemberg, Germany.

== History ==
The gate tower built around 1250 was originally open towards the inside of the city and was only enclosed with a stone wall in 1547. In 1572, a stair turret was added; in the same year Matthias Schwäri painted a picture of a merchant with a cart on the inner wall. In the 19th century, this picture sparked a legend about a Swabian man who came to Freiburg with two barrels full of gold to buy the town. He was ridiculed, especially after it turned out that the barrels only contained sand and pebbles. Before his departure, his wife had secretly replaced the gold with a worthless filling.

Until 1900, the Schwabentor remained mostly unchanged after which it was almost doubled in height according to the design of Carl Schaefer and equipped with a crow-stepped gable modelled on city towers of Northern Germany. In 1903 Fritz Geiges added a painting of Freiburg's city patron, [Saint George], depicted as a dragon hunter on the exterior. The conversions ended in 1913 with the building of historicized annexes. The conversion was partially undone in 1954, and the Schwabentor was provided with a simpler tented roof, which was similar to the original one, and a bell turret with an onion dome.

The keystone of the inner arch shows a Romanesque depiction of the "Boy with Thorn", an antique figurine, which is interpreted in a Christian way here, meaning that man walks the earth with the thorn of the Original sin within him. Whoever passes through the gate should be reminded of it.

Located near the gate is a square, which is unofficially called Platz der letzten Barrikade von 1848 (English "Square of the Last Barricade of 1848"). On Easter Monday of 1848, an association of independent, military volunteers of Baden was defeated by the superior government troops of the Grand Duke of Baden.

The Schwabentor is being renovated since the summer of 2012 and is expected to be finished by November 2013. After removing the plaster it became apparent that the damages were more severe than anticipated. The previous extension of the tower produced fissures in the walls, and the foundation has to be reinforced because it isn't stable enough. To examine this, exploratory drillings were scheduled for April 2013. In 2022, it was suggested to become a World Heritage Site.

== Traffic ==
The Schwabentor is located on the border of the pedestrian area of the city centre and usually only one line of Freiburg's tram's goes through it heading outside of the town. The annex on the north side is reserved for the tram, bikers, taxis, delivery traffic and inhabitants of the city centre heading downtown. All other traffic is led past its right hand side.

== Museum ==
Since 1969 there is a small, private museum, named the Zinnfigurenklause (German Zinnfigur is a tin figure) in the Schwabentor. Different scenes of the region's history are depicted in the museum, with the help of about 9,000 tin figures in Dioramas, mostly from the freedom movements in the South of Germany (Battle of Sempach, peasant revolts, Revolution of 1848 in Baden), but also from the time of the Protestant Reformation.

== Literature ==
- Peter Kalchthaler: Freiburg und seine Bauten. Ein kunsthistorischer Stadtrundgang. Revised 4th edition, Promo-Verlag, Freiburg (Breisgau), 2006, ISBN 3-923288-45-X, No. 41: Schwabentor.
