= Gustav Struve =

German revolutionary (1805–1870)

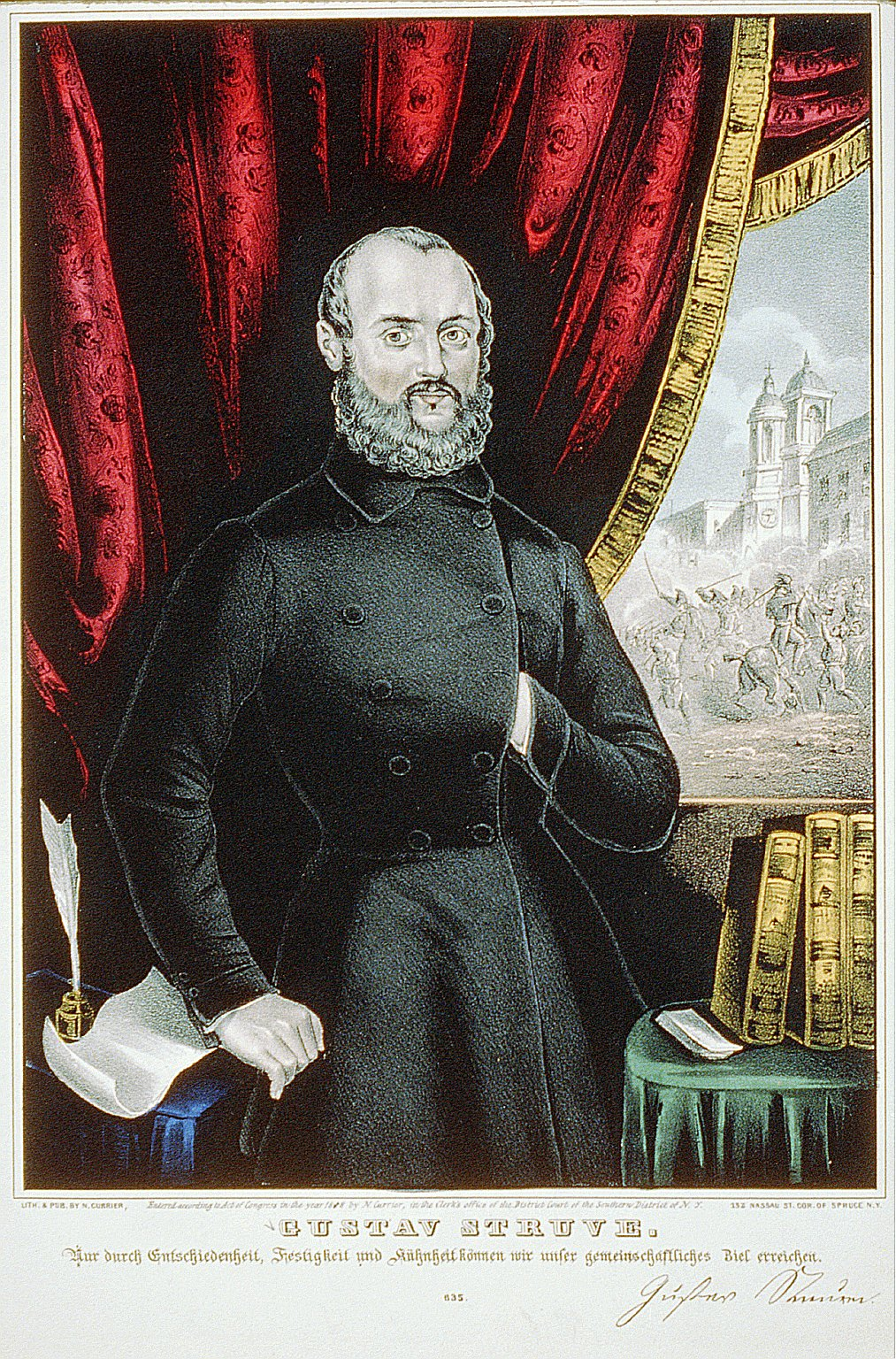
- Born: 11 October 1805; Munich, Electorate of Bavaria
- Died: 21 August 1870 (aged 64); Vienna, Austro-Hungarian Empire
- Occupations: Surgeon, politician, lawyer and publicist
- Spouse: Amalie Struve (m. 1845)

Gustav Struve, known as Gustav von Struve until he gave up his title (11 October 1805 – 21 August 1870), was a German surgeon, politician, lawyer and publicist, and a revolutionary during the German revolutions of 1848–1849 in Baden. He also spent over a decade in the United States and was active there as a reformer.

== Early years ==
Struve was born in Munich the son of a Russian diplomat Johann Christoph Gustav von Struve, whose family came from the lesser nobility. His father Gustav, after whom he was named, had served as Russian Staff Councilor at the Russian Embassy in Warsaw, Munich and The Hague, and later was the Royal Russian Ambassador at the Badonian court in Karlsruhe. The younger Gustav Struve grew up and went to school in Munich, then studied law at universities in Göttingen and Heidelberg. For a short time (from 1829 to 1831) he was employed in the civil service in Oldenburg, then moved to Baden in 1833 where in 1836 he settled down to work as a lawyer in Mannheim.

In Baden, Struve also entered politics by standing up for the liberal members of the Baden parliament in news articles. His point of view headed more and more in a radical democratic, early socialist direction. As editor of the Mannheimer Journal, he was repeatedly condemned to imprisonment. He was compelled in 1846 to retire from the management of this paper. In 1845, Struve married Amalie Düsar on 16 November 1845 and in 1847 he dropped the aristocratic "von" from his surname due to his democratic ideals.

He also gave attention to phrenology, and published three books on the subject.

== Pre-revolutionary period ==
During Vormärz, the years between the Congress of Vienna in 1815 and the revolutions of 1848-49, Struve was strongly against the politics of Metternich, a strict Conservative and reactionary against the democratic movement, who ruled Austria at the time and had a strong influence on restoration Germany with his Congress system.

== The revolution begins ==
Along with Friedrich Hecker, whom he had met in Mannheim, Struve took on a leading role in the Baden revolutions. Both Hecker and Struve belonged to the radical democratic, anti-monarchist wing of the revolutionaries. In Baden their group was particularly strong in number, with many political societies being founded in the area.

When the revolution broke out, Struve published a demand for a federal republic that included all Germany. However, this was rejected by "Pre-Parliament" (Vorparlament), the meeting of politicians and other important German figures which would later become the Frankfurt Parliament.

Still, Struve wanted to spread his radical dreams for a federal Germany across the country, starting in southwest Germany, and accompanied by Hecker and other revolutionary leaders. They organised the meeting of a revolutionary assembly in Konstanz on 14 April 1848. From there, the Heckerzug (Hecker's column) was to join up with another revolutionary group led by the poet Georg Herwegh and march to Karlsruhe. Few people joined in the march, however, and it was headed off in the Black Forest by troops from Frankfurt.

Hecker and Struve fled to Switzerland, where Struve continued to plan the struggle. He published Die Grundrechte des deutschen Volkes (The Basic Rights of the German People) and made a "Plan for the Revolution and Republicanisation of Germany" along with the revolutionary playwright and journalist Karl Heinzen. On 21 September 1848 he made another attempt to start an uprising in Germany, in Lörrach. Once again it failed, and this time Struve was caught and imprisoned.

== May Uprising in Baden ==
Struve was freed during the May Uprising in Baden in 1849. Grand Duke Leopold of Baden fled and on 1 June 1849 Struve helped set up a provisionary republican parliament under the liberal politician Lorenz Brentano. Prince Wilhelm of Prussia (the future Kaiser Wilhelm I of Germany), set out for Baden with troops. Afraid of a military escalation, Brentano reacted hesitantly - too hesitantly for Struve and his followers, who overthrew him. The revolutionaries took up arms and, led by Ludwik Mieroslawski, tried to hold off the Prussian troops, who far outnumbered them. On 23 July the revolutionaries were defeated after a fierce battle at Rastatt and the revolution came to an end.

== Post-revolutionary life ==
Gustav Struve, along with other revolutionaries, managed to escape execution, fleeing to exile, first in Switzerland and then in 1851 to the US.

In the USA, Struve lived for a time in Philadelphia. He edited Der Deutsche Zuschauer (The German Observer) in New York City, but soon discontinued its publication because of insufficient support. He wrote several novels and a drama in German, and then in 1852 undertook, with the assistance of his wife, the composition of a universal history from the standpoint of radical republicanism. The result, Weltgeschichte (World History), was published in 1860. It was the major literary product of his career and the result of 30 years of study. From 1858 to 1859, he edited Die Sociale Republik.

He also promoted German public schools in New York City. In 1856, he supported John Frémont for U.S. president. In 1860, he supported Abraham Lincoln. At the start of the 1860s, Struve joined in the American Civil War in the Union Army as a captain under Blenker, one of the many German emigrant soldiers known as the Forty-Eighters. He resigned a short time later to avoid serving under Blenker's successor, the Prussian Prince Felix Salm-Salm. Struve was an abolitionist, and opposed plans to create a colony of freed slaves in Liberia because he thought it would hinder the abolition of slavery in the United States.

== Return to Germany ==
He never became naturalized since he felt his primary objective was to battle the despots of Europe. In 1863, a general amnesty was issued to all those who had been involved in the revolutions in Germany, and Struve returned to Germany. His first wife had died in Staten Island in 1862. Back in Germany, he married a Frau von Centener. Lincoln appointed him U. S. consul at Sonneberg in 1865, but the Thuringian states refused to issue his exequatur due to his radical writings. On 21 August 1870 he died in Vienna where he had settled in 1869.

== Vegetarianism ==
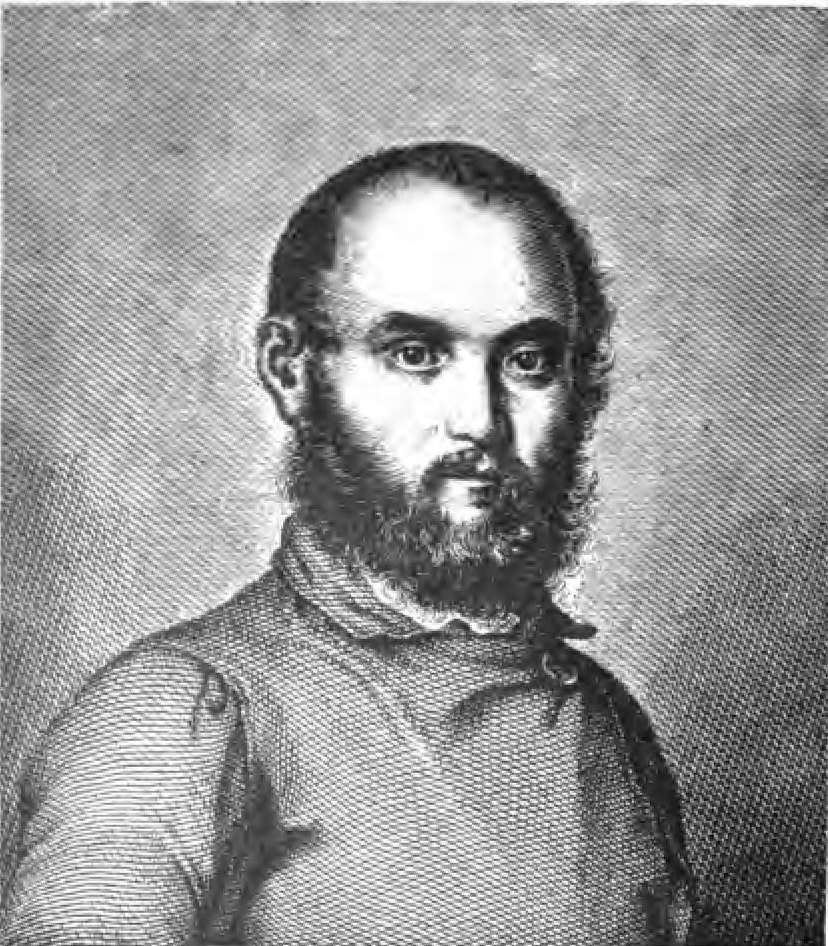
Struve as "Mandaras"

Struve was a leading figure in the initial stage of the German vegetarian movement. He had become a vegetarian in 1832 under the influence of Rousseau's treatise Émile.

Struve authored the first German vegetarian-themed novel, Mandaras Wanderungen in 1833. In this book the protagonist Mandaras is a young Brahmin from India who visits Germany for education. He finds people bowing with tears before Christ on a cross but are comfortable with killing people with the death penalty. He finds them killing and eating the flesh of other animals. He points out that in his society, nobody eats meat and that they are polytheistic. He refuses to convert to Christianity because he claims that the religion approves of murder. He is imprisoned for not having the right documents and dies in prison because he does not get vegetarian food. He founded the Vegetarische Gesellschaft Stuttgart (Stuttgart Vegetarian Society) in 1868. He wrote the vegetarian book Pflanzenkost, in 1869. Historian Corinna Treitel has noted that Struve linked "vegetarianism to republican self governance."

== Works ==
- Politische Briefe (Mannheim, 1846)
- Das öffentliche Recht des deutschen Bundes (2 vols., 1846)
- Grundzüge der Staatswissenschaft (4 vols., Frankfort, 1847–48)
- Geschichte der drei Volkserhebungen in Baden (Bern, 1849)
- Weltgeschichte (6 vols., New York, 1856–59; 7th ed., with a continuation, Coburg, 1866–69)
- Das Revolutionszeitalter (New York, 1859–60)
- Diesseits und jenseits des Oceans (Coburg, 1864-65)
- Kurzgefasster Wegweiser für Auswanderer (Bamberg, 1867)
- Pflanzenkost die Grundlage einer neuen Weltanschauung (Stuttgart, 1869)
- Das Seelenleben, oder die Naturgeschichte des Menschen (Berlin, 1869)
- Eines Fürsten Jugendliebe, a drama (Vienna, 1870)

His wife Amalie published:

- Erinnerungen aus den badischen Freiheitskämpfen (Hamburg, 1850)
- Historische Zeitbilder (3 vols., Bremen, 1850)
