= German Federal Army =

- Deutsches Bundesheer
- Active: 1815–1866
- Country: German Confederation
- Type: Army
- Role: Protecting the German Confederation and its interests
- Engagements: Second Schleswig War; Austro-Prussian War

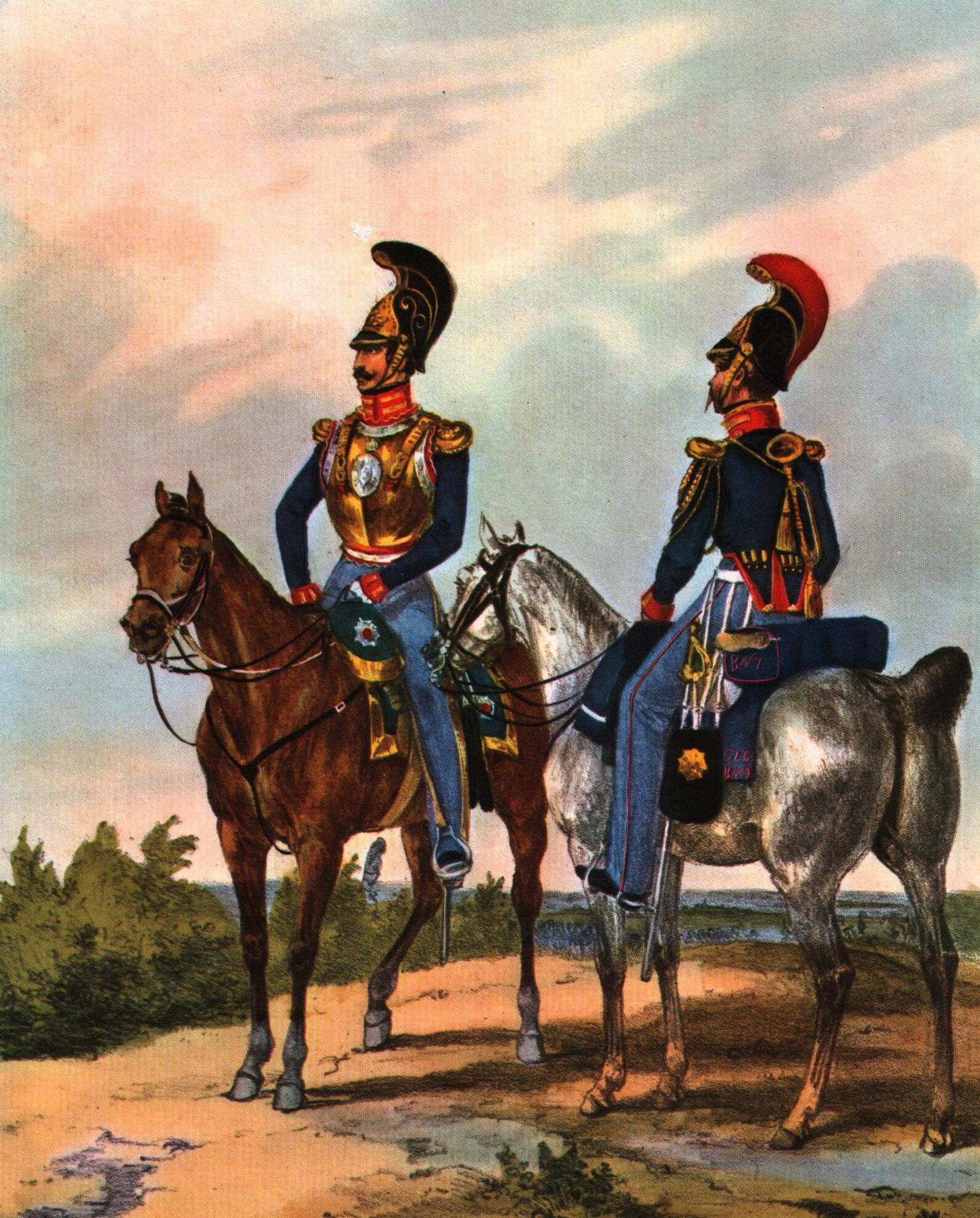
Officer and trumpeter of the Royal Hanoverian Army's Garde du Corps in 1835

The German Federal Army (German: Deutsches Bundesheer) was the military arm of the German Confederation from 1815 to 1866 whose purpose was the defence of the Confederation against external enemies. Although the Congress of Vienna in 1815 decreed the formation of the army and delimited its size and purpose, no work on its formation was begun until 1841, after the Rhine crisis brought the threat of war to Germany. Even then, only preliminary work was accomplished on troop readiness. Most work focused on the building of federal fortresses.

Most preparations were aimed toward France, from where several wars of occupation had been launched in earlier times against the Holy Roman Empire. Cases of conflict between the federal allies, such as arose later during the Second Schleswig War (the Duke of Holstein was simultaneously the King of Denmark), were not anticipated or governed.

The Austro-Prussian War, provoked by Kingdom of Prussia against the Austrian Empire, for domination of the German Confederation and its allies led to the defeat of the Federal Army in 1866 and thus to its disbandment.

== See also ==
- Army of the Holy Roman Empire
- Austro-Hungarian Army

== Literature ==
- Allmayer-Beck, Lessing: Die K.(u.)K.-Armee. 1848–1918. Bertelsmann, Munich etc., 1974, ISBN 3-570-07287-8.
- Jürgen Angelow: Von Wien nach Königgrätz – Sicherheitspolitik des Deutschen Bundes. Oldenbourg, Munich, 1996, ISBN 3-486-56143-X.
- Georg Ball: Germersheim. „Die geschleifte Festung“. Geschichte und Führer. Verlag der Dr. E. Jaegerschen Buchhandlung, Speyer, 1930 (2nd reprint: Steimer, Germersheim, 1991).
- Siegmund Bergmann (ed.): Die Infanterie des Kaisers und Königs. In: Moderne Illustrierte Zeitung. Doppelnummer 10/11, Vienna, 1 June 1914.
- Officieller Bericht über die Kriegsereignisse zwischen Hannover und Preußen im Juni 1866 und Relation der Schlacht bei Langensalza am 27. Juni 1866. Gerold, Vienna, 1866 (reprint: Rockstuhl, Bad Langensalza, 2001, ISBN 3-934748-72-4 (Erinnerungen an die Schlacht bei Langensalza 1866 4)).
- Gordon A. Craig: Königgrätz. 1866 – eine Schlacht macht Weltgeschichte. 4th edition, Zsolnay, Vienna, 1997, ISBN 3-552-04824-3.
- Heinrich A. Eckert: Das deutsche Bundesheer. Munich, 1835.
- Liliane Funcken, Fred Funcken: Historische Uniformen. Napoleonische Zeit, 18. und 19. Jahrhundert. Preussen, Deutschland, Österreich, Frankreich, Grossbritannien, Russland. Orbis-Verlag, Munich, 1989, ISBN 3-572-07442-8.
- Franz Herre: Franz Joseph. Kaiser von Österreich. Bechtermünz, Augsburg, 1997, ISBN 3-86047-814-1.
- Ian Hogg, John Batchelor: Artillerie. Das Geschütz, Eisenbahngeschütze, Küstengeschütze, Flak, Pak, Geschütze auf Selbstfahrlafetten, rückstossfreie Geschütze, Zünder. (= Die Geschichte der Artillerie) Heyne, Munich, 1977, ISBN 3-453-52068-8 (Heyne-Bildpaperback).
- Otmar Schäuffelen: Die Bundesfestung Ulm und ihre Geschichte. Europas größte Festungsanlage. 2nd ed., Vaas, Ulm, 1982, ISBN 3-88360-019-9.
- Georg Schreiber: Des Kaisers Reiterei. Österreichische Kavallerie in 4 Jahrhunderten. Mit einem Geleitwort von Alois Podhajsky. Speidel, Vienna, 1967.
- Rüdiger Wischemann: Die Festung Koblenz. Vom römischen Kastell und Preussens stärkster Festung zur grössten Garnison d. Bundeswehr. Rhenania, Koblenz, 1978.
- Das zehnte deutsche Bundes-Armeecorps im Lager bei Lüneburg In: Illustrirte Zeitung. No. 26, 23. December 1843, J.J. Weber, Leipzig, 1843, pp. 403–408.
