= Battle of Ludwigshafen =

Coordinates: 49°28′59″N 8°26′52″E

- Part of Palatine Uprising
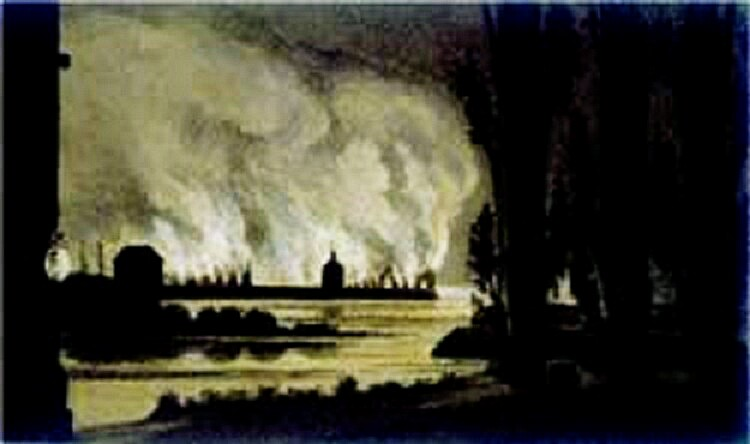
- Ludwigshafen burns - 15 June 1849
Date	15–18 June 1849
Location	Ludwigshafen; Mannheim
Result	The Prussians occupied Ludwigshafen, but the crossing over the Rhine remained closed to them.

Belligerents
Baden-Palatine revolutionary army	Prussia

Commanders and leaders
Oberst Türr; Otto von Corvin-Wiersbitzki; August Mersy	Major Künzel

Strength
800	600

Casualties and losses
17 dead; 9 wounded	2 dead; 6 wounded

The Battle of Ludwigshafen (German: Gefecht von Ludwigshafen) and the subsequent bombardment of Ludwigshafen lasted from 15 to 18 June 1849 and was part of the Palatine Uprising and Baden Revolution. The young settlement of Ludwigshafen was badly damaged by the shells of the Baden artillery and the resulting fires.

== Background ==
The movement of the March revolution within the member states of the German Confederation led to the election of Frankfurt Assembly, the first all-German parliament. This parliament proclaimed the Constitution of St. Paul's Church on 28 March 1849 that provided for the state as a hereditary constitutional monarchy. The Prussian king Frederick William IV refused the imperial crown that he was offered. On 23 April, the Bavarian king and his government rejected the constitution, which was regarded by the left as a coup.

On 2 May, it was decided to set up a ten-member National Committee for the Defence and Implementation of the Constitution and on 7 May 1849 the representative of the Central Power for the Palatinate, Bernhard Eisenstuck, legitimized the National Defence Committee.

On 3 May 1849, the May uprising in Dresden broke out, but this was put down on 9 May by Saxon and Prussian troops. On 11 May, the third Baden uprising began with the mutiny of Baden troops in the federal fortress of Rastatt.

On 11 June came the feared intervention of the 1st Prussian Army Corps under Moritz von Hirschfeld. The advance guard of his 1st Division, commanded by Major General von Hannecken, crossed the Palatine border unopposed near Kreuznach and advanced south.

On 14 June the Battle of Kirchheimbolanden took place. On 10 June 1849, Ludwik Mierosławski, a Polish revolutionary, arrived in Heidelberg to take over command of the Baden-Palatine revolutionary army which he had been given by the rebels. He then moved his headquarters to Mannheim.

On 15 June Lieutenant General Eduard von Peucker, the commander of the federal troops grouped into the Neckar Corps, brought the Baden counties of Lower and Middle Rhine onto a war footing. On that same day, a few kilometres northeast of Mannheim there was a clash at Käfertal between Hessian imperial forces and the Baden revolutionary army.

== Occupation of Ludwigshafen by the Prussians ==
On 15 June 1849 the 1st Division of the Ist Army Corps entered Frankenthal and send out an advance party to Oggersheim. From Oggersheim, Major Künzel pressed forward to Ludwigshafen with the 1st Battalion of von Goeben's 28th Infantry, a squadron of the 9th Hussars, a detachment of Jägers and two guns.

Baden infantry attacked the Prussians in front of Ludwigshafen at just before 11 o'clock, but withdrew in the face of the Prussian counter-attack. The entry points in the north and west were blocked by barricades of cotton bales and covered by the cannon of the revolutionary troops. A detachment of volunteers (Freischaren) attempted an attack but were beaten back. After a short skirmish the Prussians succeeded in seizing the two obstacles and stormed another two barricades in Rheinstraße. The rebel troops pulled back with their guns over the Rhine bridge to Mannheim. One element also escaped in the direction of Speyer. During the retreat over the bridge the insurgents suffered more losses from Prussian fire. In order to prevent a Prussian pursuit, the retreating rebels cut sections of the pontoon bridge, in the course of which several of them fell into the Rhine and drowned. After about 2 hours of fighting Ludwigshafen fell into Prussian hands at about 13.30 hours. The 1st Division left a battalion and 4 light guns in Ludwigshafen and occupied Speyer, Schifferstadt and Mutterstadt on 16 June.

== Bombardment of Ludwigshafen by the rebels ==
In the course of the fighting in Ludwigshafen the Baden revolutionaries had brought heavy artillery into action on the Mannheim side of the Rhine which, during the retreat of the rebels over the pontoon bridge, started a bombardment of Ludwigshafen. The Prussians had to withdraw their light guns out of range of the Baden artillery and were unable to engage them. Just before 3 p.m. on 15 June a Baden shell started a fire in a warehouse in Ludwigshafen's harbour area, which quickly engulfed buildings in the whole port. Later in the day, the pontoon also caught fire. The shelling continued all night on the 15/16 June with few interruptions. After a pause in the early morning the shooting continued on 16 June from 7 to 11 o'clock. The Prussians fired at houses on the Mannheim shore with hot shot in order to drive the riflemen out, but were unable to take on the heavy Baden artillery, which was directed by the Swiss gunner officer, Arnold Steck and by Otto von Corvin-Wiersbitzki.

The shelling continued on 17 June without either side gaining any real success. On 18 June the Prussians relieved their troops in Ludwigshafen with fresh units, even though the arrival of units of the West Franconian Corps of the Bavarian Army were due to arrive on the 19th. During this relief in place the Baden artillery increased the rate of shelling. On 18 June just before 2200 hours, the Baden troops attempted to cross the Rhine in boats, but the operation was foiled by Prussian defensive fire. On 19 June the guns fell silent on both sides of the Rhine. From 15 to 18 June, it is estimated that 1,000 shells were fired at Ludwigshafen from Mannheim.

== Arrival of Bavaria ==
The West Franconian Corps of the Bavarian Army under Lieutenant General Karl Theodor von Thurn und Taxis had crossed the Rhine at Oppenheim on 18 June with 9,500 men, having begun the invasion on 16 June. On 19 June around 2300 hours the Bavarian forces advanced with one Jäger battalion, two squadrons of cavalry and a battery of artillery into the destroyed town of Ludwigshafen. It was their intention to support the assault of Mannheim by the Army Corps of Lieutenant General Eduard von Peucker.

== Consequences ==
The Prussians were not able to cross the Rhine at Mannheim, but the Palatine army under Franz Sznayde was no longer to combine forces with the Baden troops at Mannheim. As a result, the Palatines crosse the Rhine bridge at Knielingen on 18 June. The Prussians followed up on 20 June at Germersheim.

== Literature ==
- Daniel Staroste: Tagebuch über die Ereignisse in der Pfalz und Baden im Jahre 1849: ein Erinnerungsbuch für die Zeitgenossen und für Alle, welche Theil nahmen an der Unterdrückung jenes Aufstandes, Vol. 1, Potsdam, 1852, pp. 181–184; 186–188 at Google Books
- Otto Fleischmann: Geschichte des pfälzischen Aufstandes im Jahre 1849: nach den zugänglichen Quellen geschildert, E. Thieme, Kaiserslautern, 1899, pp. 280–282 at Internet.archive
- Friedrich Walter: Geschichte Mannheims vom Übergang an Baden (1802) bis zur Gründung des Reiches, Mannheim, 1907, pp. 393–398 at Google Books
- Otto Julius Bernhard von Corvin-Wiersbitzki: Erinnerungen eines Volkskämpfers, Gebrüder Binger, Amsterdam, 1861, Vol. 3, pp. 263–282 online at Google Books
