= Battle of Kirchheimbolanden =

Battle of the 1849 Palatine uprising

Coordinates: 49°40′4″N 8°0′50″E

- Part of Palatine Uprising
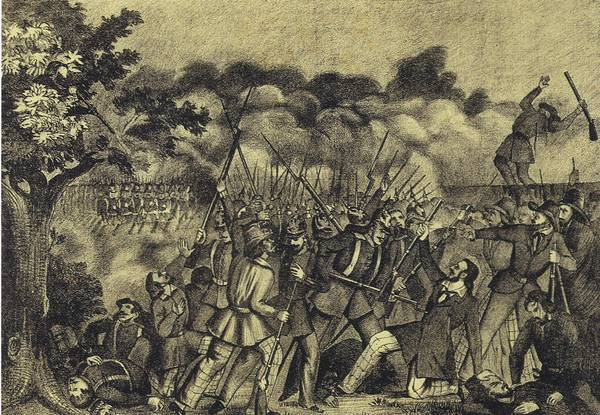
Date	14 June 1849
Location	Kirchheimbolanden
Result	The irregulars (Freischaren) were defeated

Belligerents
Palatine rebel army	Prussia

Commanders and leaders
N. Rouppert	Colonel von Schleinitz

Casualties and losses
50 dead; 30 taken prisoner	3 wounded

The Battle of Kirchheimbolanden (German: Gefecht bei Kirchheimbolanden) was the first battle in the Palatine Uprising of 1849. It took place on 14 June near Kirchheimbolanden and ended in the defeat of the volunteers (Freischaren) by the Prussian Army.

== Background ==
The movement of the March revolution within the member states of the German Confederation led to the election of Frankfurt Assembly, the first all-German parliament. This parliament proclaimed the Constitution of St. Paul's Church on 28 March 1849 that provided for the state as a hereditary constitutional monarchy. The Prussian king Frederick William IV refused the imperial crown that he was offered. On 23 April, the Bavarian king and his government rejected the constitution, which was regarded by the left as a coup.

On 2 May, it was decided to set up a ten-member National Committee for the Defence and Implementation of the Constitution and on 7 May 1849 the representative of the Central Power for the Palatinate, Bernhard Eisenstuck, legitimized the National Defence Committee. On 3 May 1849, the May uprising in Dresden broke out, but this was put down on 9 May by Saxon and Prussian troops. On 11 May, the third Baden uprising began with the mutiny of Baden troops in the federal fortress of Rastatt.

The request by the Palatine state committee for the support of Baden and Hesse was made on 9 May in Rheinhessen. and led to the calling up of a Rhenish-Hessian volunteer army or Freikorps by Franz Zitz and Ludwig Bamberger. Military command was initially given to Karl Ludwig Heußner. The corps assembled in Wörrstadt and marched via Alzey to Pfeddersheim and then on to Kirchheimbolanden.

On 11 June, came the feared intervention of the 1st Prussian Army Corps under Moritz von Hirschfeld. The advance guard of his 1st Division, commanded by Major General von Hannecken, crossed the Palatine border unopposed near Kreuznach and advanced south.

== Participating units ==
The Rhenish-Hesse Freikorps - under the Pole, N. Rouppert, appointed by General Sznayde - which included members of the gymnastic club of Mainz and the worker's union - had originally about 1,500 men and four small iron cannon.

The vanguard of the 4th Division of the 1st Prussian Army Corps with the Berlin-based Guards Landwehr Battalion, the fusilier battalion of the 24th Infantry Regiment, two squadrons of the 7th Uhlan Regiment and two cannon under Colonel von Schleinitz.

== Course of the battle ==
As early as 13 June, during a recce by the Prussians near Morschheim, there was a clash with a company of volunteers, who reported one dead and two wounded.

The rebels left behind in Morschheim as an outpost left their positions, against orders, on the night of 13/14 June and withdrew to Kirchheimbolanden. The advance of the Prussians was spotted in Kirchheimbolanden on 14 June at 5 a.m. A Prussian company of fusiliers occupied Orbis, initially unopposed, and continued from the northwest towards Kirchheimbolanden, while the main body of the Prussian units attacked the town from the north. A third group advanced from the west. One company of the Freikorps initially resisted the Prussians in front of the town, but then pulled back when it was attacked from three sides. The situation of the Freikorp, which had come under artillery fire, had become precarious. Because the Polish Major Rouppert, who was formally in command, made no decisions, a withdrawal to Rockenhausen was organised by Zitz and Bamberger. One section of Mainz riflemen remained, for reasons unknown, in the castle garden where a company of the Guards Landwehr battalion captured the barricade. The Landwehr and fusiliers soon broke through the main gate into the castle garden where the volunteers were killed or captured. Among the prisoners was Mathilde Hitzfeld, who is portrayed in one illustration holding a flag at a barricade, an image that is probably based on portraits of the French Revolution.

The Rhenish-Hessian Freikorps pulled back further to Neustadt an der Weinstraße, where it was united with Schlinke's militia (Volkswehr) battalion and Blenker's corps and then marched over the bridge over the Rhine at Knielingen on 18 June and made for Baden. On 20 June the Rhenish-Hesse Freikorps was disbanded.

The Prince of Prussia, the supreme commander of the whole army that defeated the revolution in the Palatinate and in Baden accompanied the 4th Division and personally thanked his troops after the battle.

== Commemoration ==
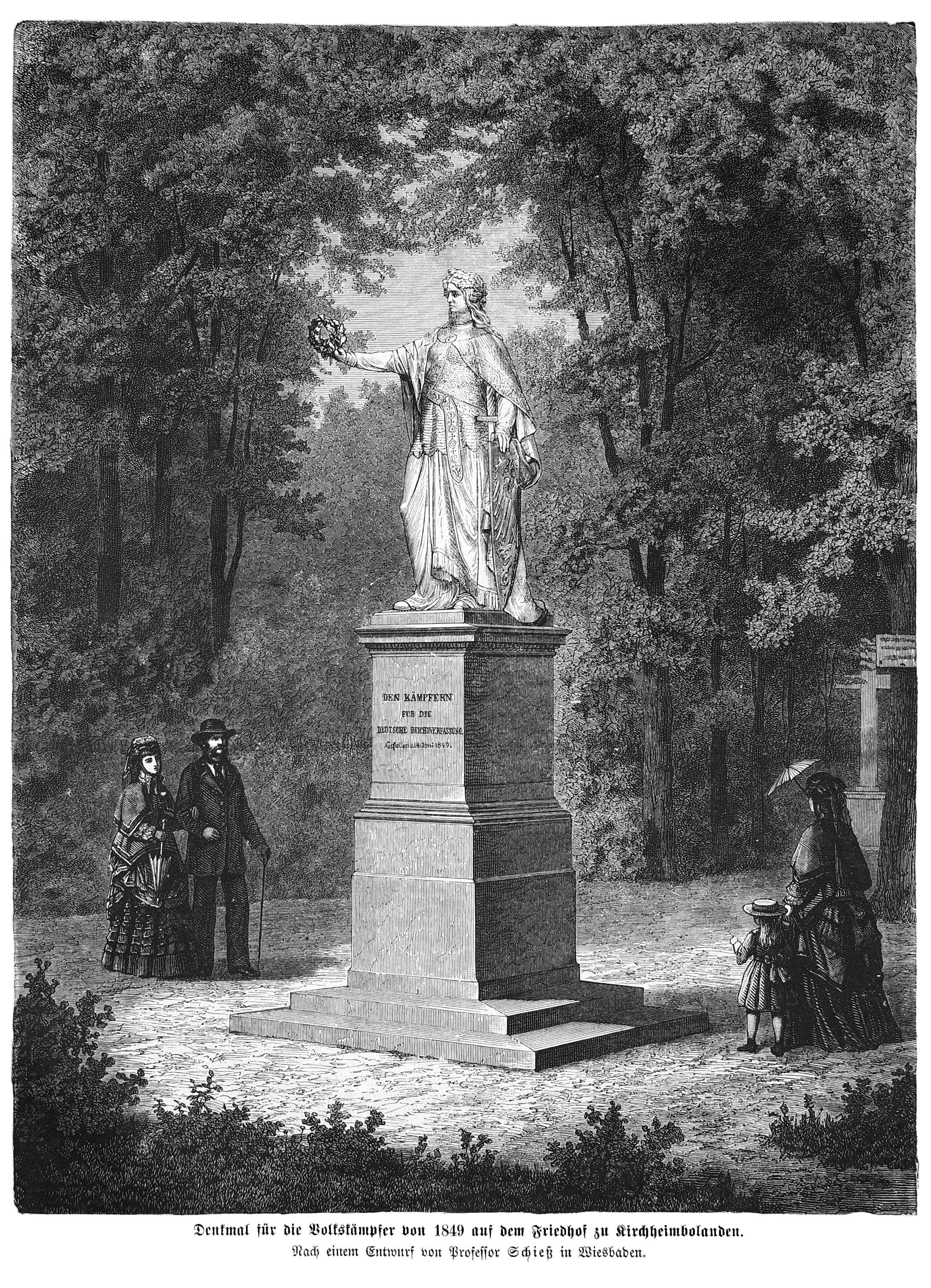
Monument to the rebels of 1849 in the cemetery of Kirchheimbolanden. Based on a drawing by Professor Schieß in Wiesbaden.

On 16 June 1872 a monument to the rebels who had fallen on 14 June 1849 was unveiled at the cemetery in Kirchheimbolanden. It depicts Germania with a shield emblazoned with the imperial eagle. On the pedestal is an inscription that reads as follows: "In 1848–1849 the German imperial assembly in Frankfurt a. M., which was elected by the German people, discussed and legally agreed a German imperial constitution whose introduction and execution, however, was opposed by various German princes against the wish and wellbeing of the people. The population of the Bavarian Palatinate and of Baden stood up for their rights, but their militia [Volkswehr] were defeated by the superior forces deployed by the princes, and the hope of creating a united, free German empire receded over the horizon. In these battles for their rights the Palatine people were supported by men and boys from the neighbouring province of Rhenish Hesse who were inspired by [notions of] fatherland and freedom and formed a volunteer force that had to take part, here in Kirchheimbolanden on 14 June 1849, in the first battle against the Prussian army formation that advanced into the Palatinate, whereby the following [names listed] died a hero's death for freedom and fatherland and found their last resting place in this cemetery."

== Literature ==
- Daniel Staroste: Tagebuch über die Ereignisse in der Pfalz und Baden im Jahre 1849: ein Erinnerungsbuch für die Zeitgenossen und für Alle, welche Theil nahmen an der Unterdrückung jenes Aufstandes, Vol. 1, Potsdam, 1852, p. 178–180 at Google Books
- Otto Fleischmann: Geschichte des pfälzischen Aufstandes im Jahre 1849: nach den zugänglichen Quellen geschildert, E. Thieme, Kaiserslautern, 1899, pp. 284–302 in the Internet archive
- Ludwig Bamberger: Erlebnisse aus der Pfälzischen Erhebung im Mai und Juni 1849. Frankfurt a.M., 1849, pp. 76–79 online at the University Library of Frankfurt
- Johann Philipp Becker/ Christian Esselen: Geschichte der süddeutschen Mairevolution des Jahres 1849. Geneva, 1849, pp. 305–307 at Google Books
