= Palatine uprising =

1849 uprising in Bavaria

Palatine Uprising
- Part of the German revolutions of 1848–1849 and the unification of Germany
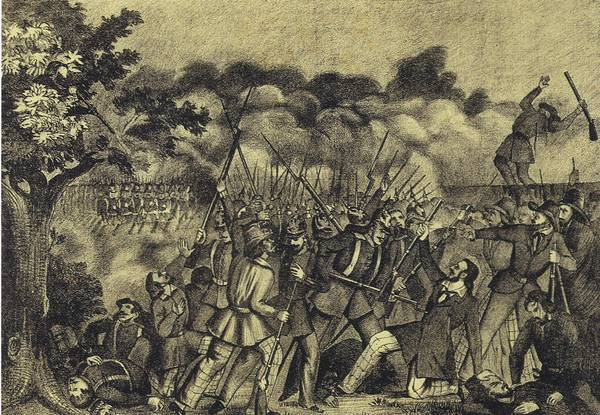
- Rebel forces during the Battle of Kirchheimbolanden
Date	May 1849 – June 1849
Location	Rheinkreis
Result	Rebellion quelled: Establishment of German state and introduction of liberal constitution

Belligerents
German Confederation: Kingdom of Bavaria; Kingdom of Prussia; Rhineland-Palatinate	German Empire; German revolutionaries

Commanders and leaders
King Frederick William IV; Moritz von Hirschfeld	August Willich; Ludwig Blenker; Alexander Schimmelfennig; Franz Heinrich Zitz; Franz Sigel

Units involved
I Army Corps	Palatine militia (Volkswehr); Palatine Freischar; Rhenish-Hessian Freikorps

The Palatine uprising (German: Pfälzischer Aufstand or Pfälzer Aufstand) was a rebellion that took place in May and June 1849 in the Rhenish Palatinate, which was then an exclave territory of the Kingdom of Bavaria. Related to uprisings across the Rhine in Baden, it was part of the widespread Imperial Constitution Campaign (Reichsverfassungskampagne). Revolutionaries worked to defend the constitution and to secede from the Kingdom of Bavaria.

== Background ==
The movement of the March Revolution in the member states of the German Confederation had led to the election of the Frankfurt Assembly, the first all-German parliament. This parliament had enacted a Constitution of the German Empire on 28 March 1849; it established a hereditary constitutional monarchy. King Frederick William IV of Prussia refused to accept the imperial crown under this constitution.

In the Kingdom of Bavaria, the first parliamentary elections were to take place on 7 December 1848. The result was a majority in favour of the Left (die Linke), the so-called "Followers of Popular Sovereignty and the Unity of Germany". In the Palatinate, voters had elected Left representatives to all 19 seats. At the opening of parliament on 22 January 1849, King Maximilian II promised further reforms. On 9 January, the majority of the parliament enacted a bill of rights, as proposed by the Frankfurt Assembly in December 1848. The king refused to recognize their act and adjourned the parliament on 8 March. On 23 April, the king and his government rejected the Frankfurt Constitution; on 14 April, the Bavarian Supreme Court rejected the validity of the document for Bavaria.

The left regarded those actions as a coup d'etat. Palatine deputies returned to the municipalities with a resolution: it said that failure to recognize the constitution was "a criminal rebellion against the newly created legal order; and any use of force [would be] treason against the German Nation". The March societies in the Bavarian territories of the Palatinate, Franconia and Swabia demanded adoption of the constitution, abolition of the monarchy, and separation of the Palatinate and Franconia from the Kingdom of Bavaria.

On 3 May 1849, the May Uprising in Dresden broke out, but was put down on 9 May by Saxon and Prussian troops. On 11 May, the third Baden uprising began with the mutiny of Baden troops in the federal fortress of Rastatt.

== Course of the uprising ==
=== Palatinate committee for the defence of the constitution ===
On 1 May 1849, a meeting of the democratic people's associations was held in Kaiserslautern. About 12,000 people gathered under the slogan, "If the government becomes rebellious, the citizens of the Palatinate will become the enforcers of the laws". On 2 May, they decided to establish a ten-man "State Committee for the Defence and Implementation of the Constitution". They did not declare a republic, as had happened in Baden. Within a short time, the committee took over the province. it formed people's militias and required officials to swear an oath to the constitution. The committee formed a revolutionary army, which was joined by thousands of soldiers from the Royal Bavarian Army. On 7 May 1849, Bernhard Eisenstuck, representative of the central authority for the Palatinate, legitimized the defence committee. He was dismissed on 11 May for exceeding his powers.

=== Provisional government ===
On 17 May 1849, a people's assembly in Kaiserslautern decided to establish a five-man provisional government under the leadership of lawyer Joseph Martin Reichard. Also elected to the government were Philip Hepp, Friedrich Schüler (absent; later declined to stand), August Ferdinand Culmann (absent; later declined to stand), Georg Friedrich Kolb (absent; later declined to stand). In place of the absentees, Peter Fries, Jean Louis Christian Greiner and Nicholas Schmitt were selected.

This government voted in favour of the Frankfurt Constitution and prepared for separation from Bavaria. If only for a few weeks, the Rhenish Palatinate achieved separation from Bavarian rule. On 18 May 1849, it agreed to an alliance with the Baden Republic.

Members of the provisional revolutionary government of the Palatinate (selection)

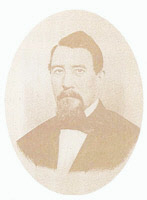
Joseph Martin Reichard - President and Minister of War

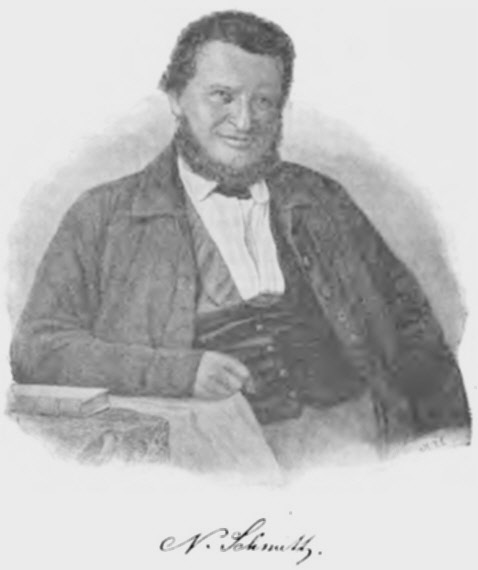
Nikolaus Schmitt - Home Office Minister

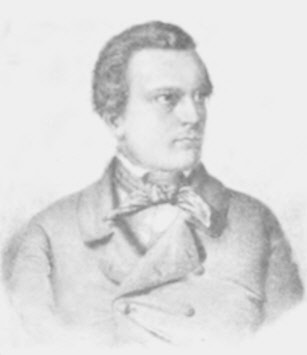
Peter Fries - Justice Minister

=== Revolutionary army ===
The command of the revolutionary units was transferred on 9 May 1849 to Daniel Fenner von Fenneberg; however, he relinquished this position on 20 May. That day a military commission was formed, with the chairmanship held by Fritz Anneke. On 21 May, the military command was given to Franz Sznayde. Ludwig Blenker was appointed as commander of the people's militia and August Willich as commander of all Palatine volunteers. Franz Zitz and Ludwig Bamberger commanded a Rhenish-Hessian freikorps.

=== Defeat ===
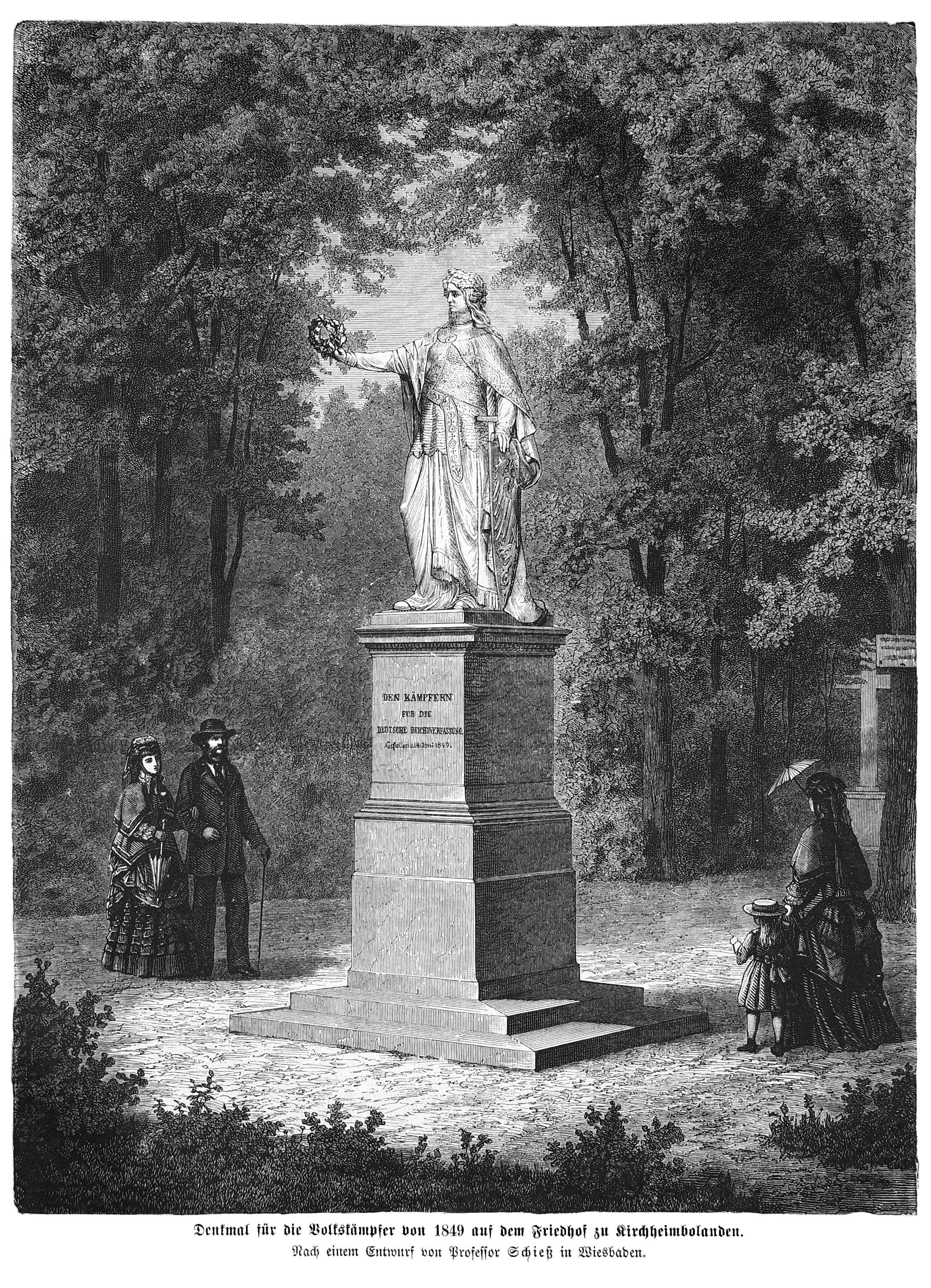
Freischar memorial in Kirchheimbolanden

On 11 June the feared Prussian intervention began. The advance guard of the 1st Division of the 1st Prussian Army Corps under Major General von Hannecken crossed the Palatine border unopposed near Kreuznach.

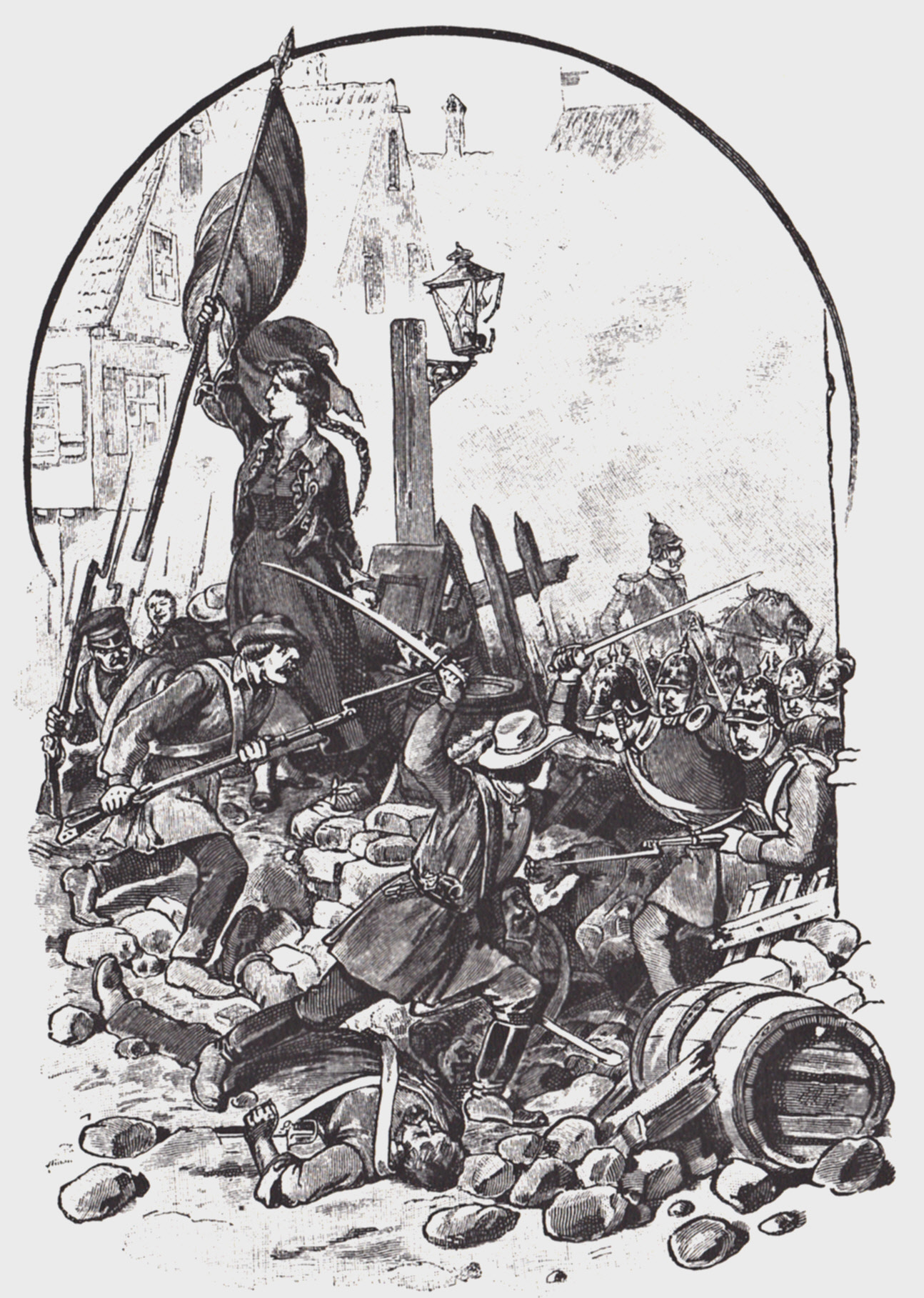
Battle of Kirchheimbolanden on 14 June 1849; with the flag of Mathilde Hitzfeld

At Kirchheimbolanden, there was a battle on 14 June. Men of the people's militia were led by Mathilde Hitzfeld, but they were all killed or captured. Against the army of 19,000 Prussian soldiers under Moritz von Hirschfeld, the revolutionary troops were poorly armed and vastly outclassed in training. They put up hardly any resistance. By that time, the Palatine uprising had become increasingly radical and no longer had broad support amongst the rural population. On 14 June 1849 the provisional government fled, and Bavarian officials returned to their positions. With the Battle of Ludwigshafen on 15 June and the Battle of Rinnthal on 17 June 1849, fighting on Palatine soil was practically over. The Palatine revolutionary army retreated on 18 June over the Knielingen Rhine bridge towards Baden, followed by its rearguard, the Willich Freikorps, on 19 June.

As a result of the rebellion, the government pursued 333 legal cases under charges of high treason. Two death sentences were passed against revolutionary Bavarian officers. On 9 March 1850 in Landau in der Pfalz, Lieutenant Graf Fugger was executed; but Major Fach was able to escape.

== See also ==
- Baden Revolution
- Storming of the Prüm Armoury
- May Uprising in Dresden
- Revolutions of 1848 in the German states
- Rump Parliament

== Literature ==
- Frank Lorenz Müller: Die Revolution von 1848/49. Darmstadt, 2002.
- Jonathan Sperber: Rhineland Radicals. The Democratic Movement and the Revolution of 1848-1849. Princeton, 1991.
- Gustav Struve: Geschichte der drei Volkserhebungen in Baden. Verlag von Jenni, Sohn, Bern 1849. (amended reprint: Verlag Rombach, Freiburg i.Br., 1980, pp. 240–254)
- Johann Philipp Becker/ Christian Esselen: Geschichte der süddeutschen Mairevolution des Jahres 1849. Geneva, 1849 at Google Books
- Daniel Staroste: Tagebuch über die Ereignisse in der Pfalz und Baden im Jahre 1849: ein Erinnerungsbuch für die Zeitgenossen und für Alle, welche Theil nahmen an der Unterdrückung jenes Aufstandes, Vol. 1, Potsdam, 1852; Vol. 2, Potsdam, 1853
- Otto Fleischmann: Geschichte des pfälzischen Aufstandes im Jahre 1849: nach den zugänglichen Quellen geschildert, E. Thieme, Kaiserslautern, 1899 at Internet.archive
- Daniel Fenner von Fenneberg: Zur Geschichte der rheinpfälzischen Revolution und des badischen Aufstandes, Zürich, 1850
- Ludwig Bamberger: Erlebnisse aus der Pfälzischen Erhebung im Mai und Juni 1849. Frankfurt a.M. 1849 online at the University Library of Frankfurt
- Christian Zinn: Die Erhebung in der Rheinpfalz und die pfälzische Volkswehr in Baden, 1850
- Friedrich Münich: Aus dem Leben Seiner Durchlaucht des Fürsten Carl Theodor v. Thurn und Taxis, königlich bayerischer General der Cavalerie: als Manuscript für d. Familie gedruckt. Straub, 1869, pp. 84–103 online at Google Books
