= Battle of Rinnthal =

Battle of Palatine Uprising

Coordinates: 49°13′16″N 7°55′14″E

- Part of Palatine Uprising
Date	17 June 1849
Location	Rinnthal
Result	The irregulars (Freischaren) were defeated and the Prussians advanced on Landau

Belligerents
Palatine rebel army	Vanguard of the 2nd Division of the 1st Army Corps

Commanders and leaders
August Willich	Major von Mutius

Strength
1,600	1,300

Casualties and losses
20 dead; 20 wounded; 20 taken prisoner	9 wounded

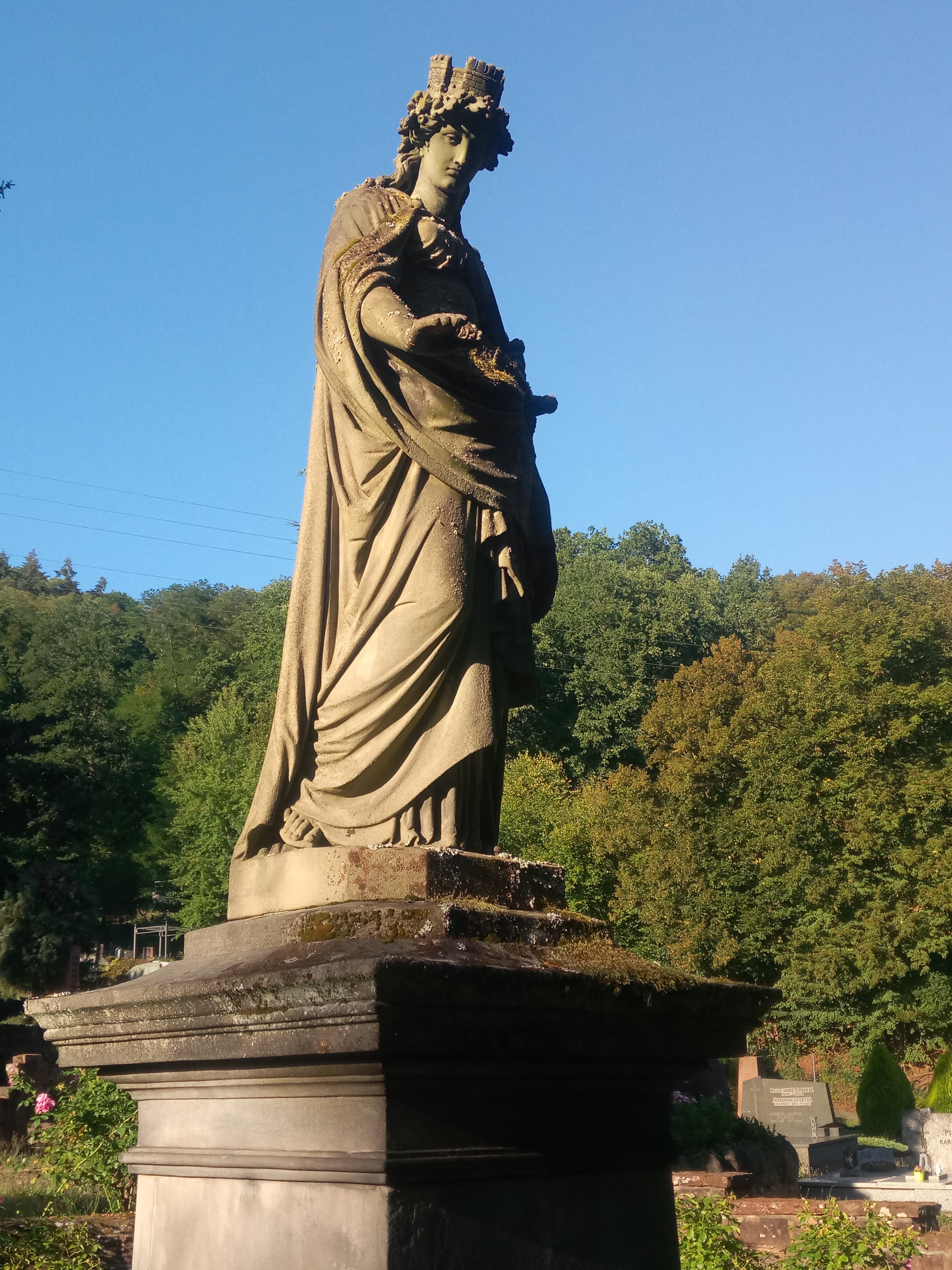
Annweiler Cemetery, memorial monument for the fallen of 1849

The Battle of Rinnthal (German: Gefecht bei Rinnthal, sometimes called the Schlacht von Rinnthal) was the heaviest battle of the Palatine uprising and took place on 17 June 1849 near Rinnthal in the Annweiler valley in Europe. The revolutionary troops under August Willich tried in vain to halt the advance of Prussian troops on Landau.

== Background ==
The movement of the March revolution within the member states of the German Confederation led to the election of Frankfurt Assembly, the first all-German parliament. This parliament proclaimed the Constitution of St. Paul's Church on 28 March 1849 that provided for the state as a hereditary constitutional monarchy. The Prussian king Frederick William IV refused the imperial crown that he was offered. On 23 April, the Bavarian king and his government rejected the constitution, which was regarded by the left as a coup. On 2 May, it was decided to set up a ten-member National Committee for the Defence and Implementation of the Constitution and on 7 May 1849 the representative of the Central Power for the Palatinate, Bernhard Eisenstuck, legitimized the National Defence Committee. On 3 May 1849, the May uprising in Dresden broke out, but this was put down on 9 May by Saxon and Prussian troops. On 11 May, the third Baden uprising began with the mutiny of Baden troops in the federal fortress of Rastatt.

On 11 June, the feared Prussian intervention began - the advance guard of the 1st Division of the 1st Prussian Army Corps under Major General von Hannecken crossed the Palatine border unopposed near Kreuznach and advanced south.

== Participating units ==
In the forefront of the rebel army, was a Palatine militia (Volkswehr) battalion under Alexander Schimmelfennig, which had retreated from Hinterweidenthal to Rinnthal in front of the Prussian army. On 17 June, August Willich and his irregulars (Freischar) moved from Frankweiler to join Schimmelpfenning at Rinnthal. He also brought the Karlsruhe volunteers (Freikorps) under Dreher with him and Friedrich Engels was also part of Willich's force.

Major Mutius advanced with the vanguard of the 2nd Division of the 1st Army Corps. Initially a fusilier battalion of the 25th Infantry Regiment, a Jäger company and two guns advanced towards the volunteers, whilst another battalion was dispatched via Spirkelbach to Sarnstall to bypass the volunteer position. The remaining units initially remained behind Wilgartswiesen.

== Course of the battle ==
The volunteers had barricaded the road between Wilgartswiesen and Rinnthal in order to stop the advance of the Prussian troops towards Landau at a narrow point in the valley. The Prussian advance guard under Major von Mutius came under fire, whereupon the heights on the left of the road which were only lightly held by a militia battalion under Schimmelpfennig were stormed by the Prussian Jägers. The fusiliers captured the bridge in front of Rinnthal and then occupied the hill of Buchholzer Berg, which had also not been held in sufficient strength by the volunteers. Now that the Prussians could fire on the rebels in the valley, the latter conducted an organised fighting withdrawal to Sarnstall. There, however, they broke into a wild, disorganised retreat. On 18 July, the scattered troops then withdrew, together with the main body of the Palatine rebel army, over the bridge at Knielingen to Baden - Willich's Freikorps being the last unit to cross on 19 June.

== Commemoration ==
An information board on the B 10 federal highway near Rinnthal indicates the site of the battle. At various places in the Palatinate there are memorial stones to the fallen, for example in Annweiler.

== Literature ==
- Daniel Staroste: Tagebuch über die Ereignisse in der Pfalz und Baden im Jahre 1849: ein Erinnerungsbuch für die Zeitgenossen und für Alle, welche Theil nahmen an der Unterdrückung jenes Aufstandes, Vol. 1, Potsdam, 1852, pp. 192–194 in Google Books
- Friedrich Engels: Die deutsche Reichsverfassungskampagne. In: Karl Marx - Friedrich Engels - Werke, Vol. 7, pp. 109–197, Dietz Verlag, Berlin/DDR 1960, hier S. 168-171 online
- Kurt Baumann: Die Pfalz und die Revolution von 1848/49. Von der Frankfurter Nationalversammlung zu den Freischärlerkämpfen bei Rinnthal. In: Pfälzische Heimatblätter 21 (1973)12, pp. 1–5.
- Kurt Baumann: Friedrich Engels und der pfälzische Aufstand 1849. Die Schlacht bei Rinnthal und der Rückzug der pfälzischen Revolutionsarmee. In: Die Rheinpfalz. Pirmasenser Nachrichten 26, No. 270 dated 21 November 1970, p. 8
