= Joseph Martin Reichard =

German politician and revolutionary

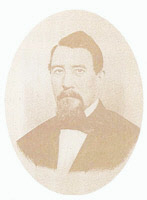
Reichard in 1869.

Joseph Martin Reichard (23 September 1803 – 14 May 1872) was a German politician and revolutionary. He was a lawyer by profession and a democrat by philosophy. He was elected as a deputy to the Frankfurt National Assembly in 1848, and served as a member of the Provisional Government in the Palatinate during the uprising of 1849. He died in 1872.
