= Circle of the Rhine =

Bavarian administrative district (1816–1946)

Rheinkreis Pfalz (from 1837)
- Regierungsbezirk of the Kingdom of Bavaria and the Free State of Bavaria
- 1816–1946
- Coat of arms

- Map of the Palatinate ( red) within the Kingdom of Bavaria ( blue) and within the German Empire ( peach)
- Capital: Speyer
- Area transferred
  - 1920: Saarpfalz-Kreis to Saar Basin
- History
  - Treaty of Munich: 1 May 1816
  - Palatine uprising: 1 May 1849
  - Occupation of the Rhineland: 1 December 1918
  - Establishment of Territory of the Saar Basin: 10 January 1920
  - Establishment of Rhineland-Palatinate: 30 August 1946
Preceded by	Succeeded by
Austrian Empire	Rhineland-Palatinate; Saar Protectorate

The Circle of the Rhine or Rhine Circle (German: Rheinkreis), sometimes the Bavarian Rheinkreis (Bayerischer Rheinkreis or Baierischer Rheinkreis), was the name given to the territory on the west bank of the Rhine from 1816 to 1837 which was one of 15 (later 8) administrative districts of the Kingdom of Bavaria. Before the French revolutionary wars (1792) most of the land had belonged to the Electoral Palatinate. At the Congress of Vienna in 1815 it was initially promised to the Austrian Empire after having been under a provisional joint Austro-Bavarian administration since 1814. However, in the Treaty of Munich (1816), Austria relinquished the territory to Bavaria.

In 1837, the Circle of the Rhine was renamed the Palatinate (Pfalz). It was also referred to as the Rhenish Palatinate (Rheinpfalz). The territory remained Bavarian until 30 August 1946, with the exception of the area detached in 1920, which roughly corresponded to the present day Saarpfalz-Kreis. It then became part of the newly formed federal state of Rhineland-Palatinate.

== Geography ==
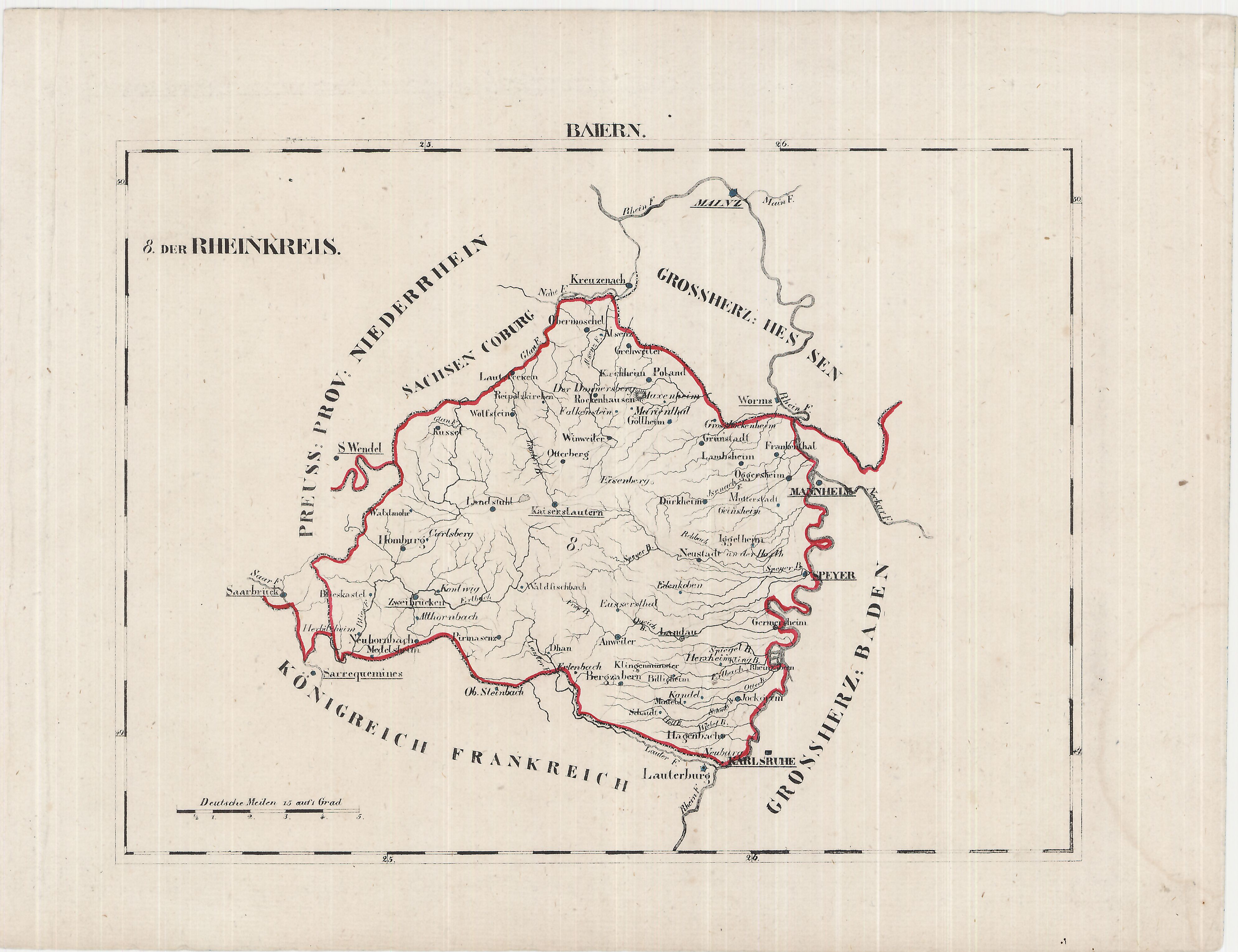
Circle of the Rhine 1830

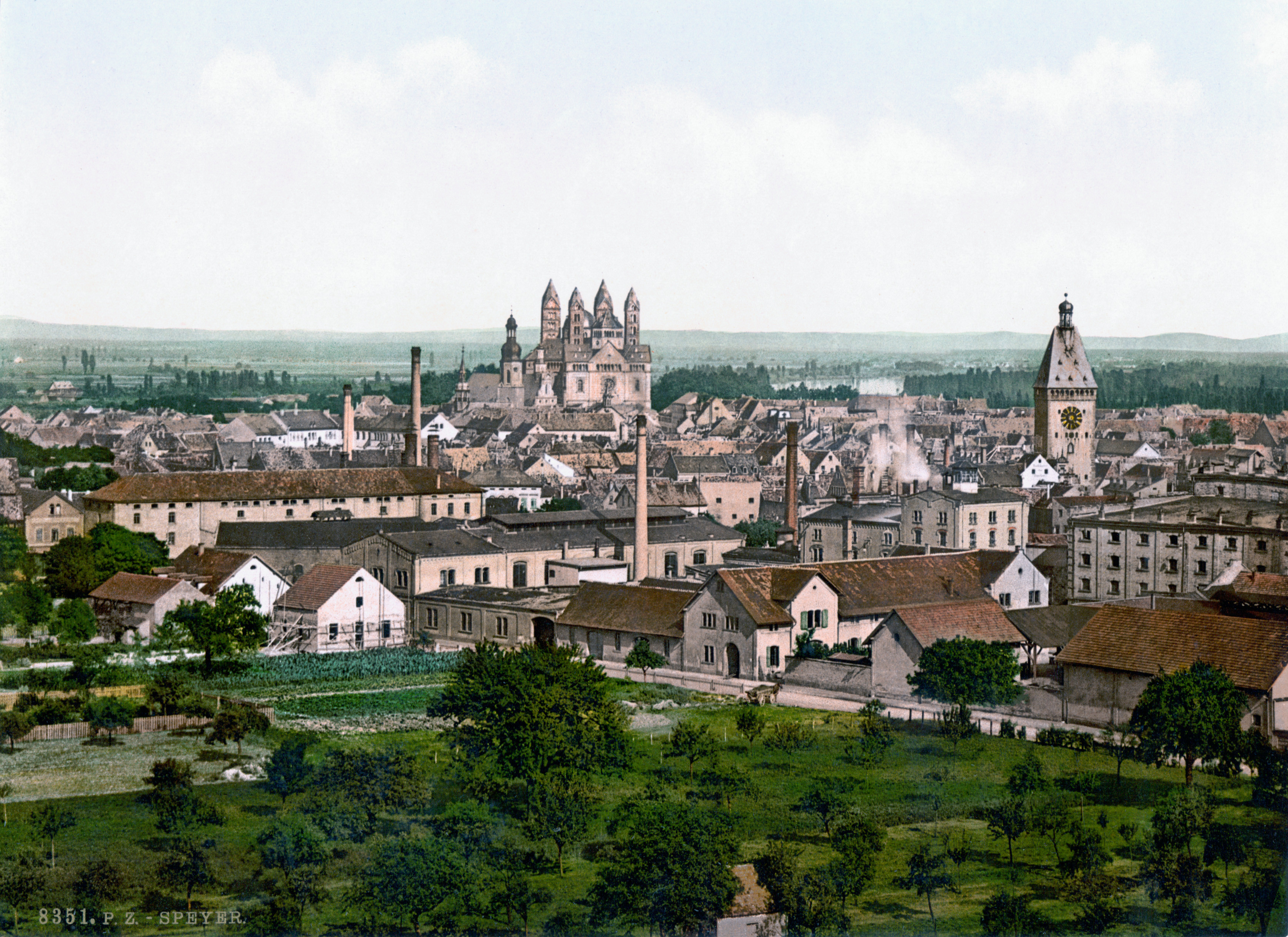
Speyer around 1900 in Bavarian times

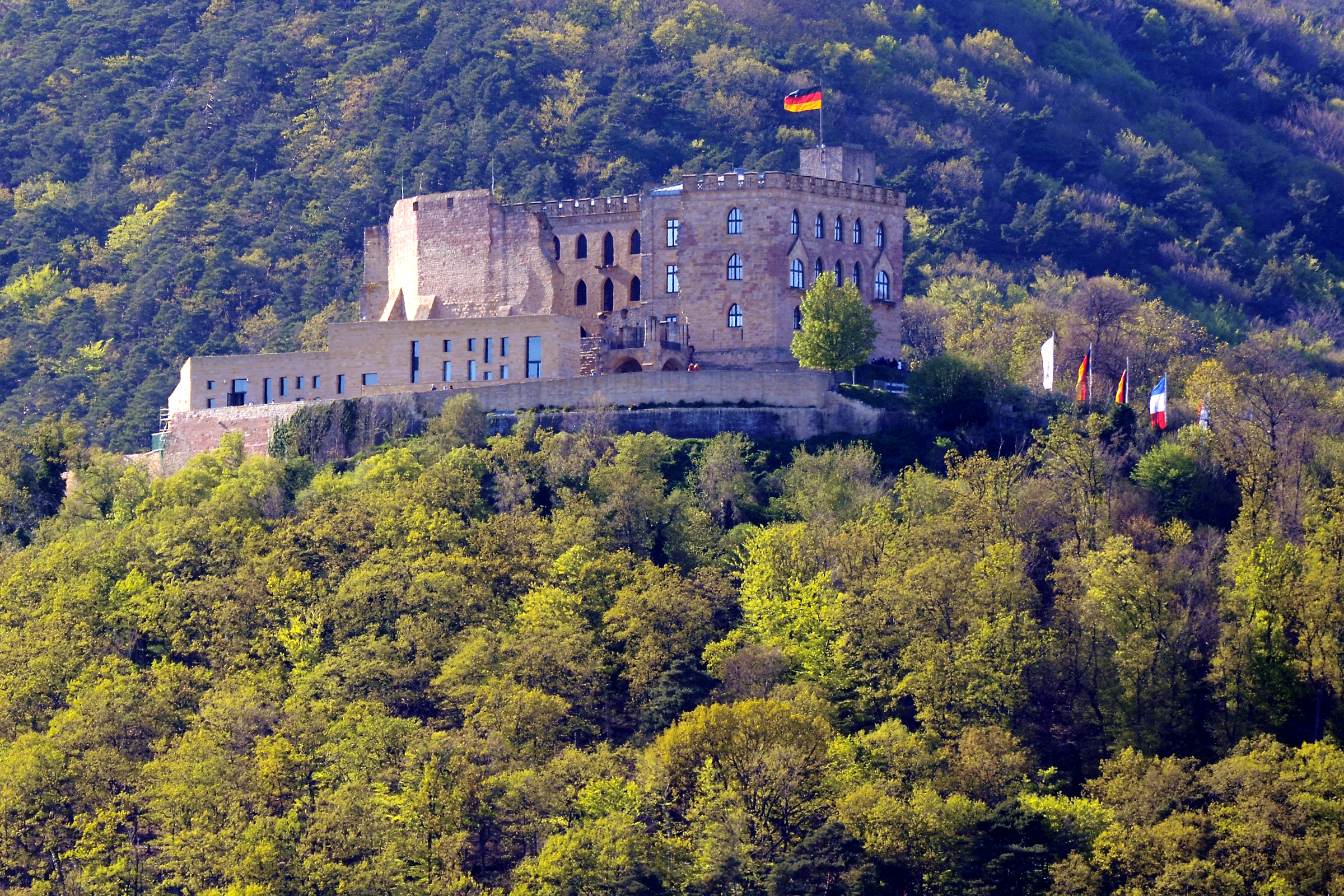
Hambach Castle, scene of the Hambach Festival in 1832

The Rhine Circle largely covered the same area as the present Palatinate region, which lies west of the Rhine in the south of the German state of Rhineland-Palatinate. Until 1919 it also included some territory around Homburg and Sankt Ingbert (parts of the Bezirksämter of Homburg and Zweibrücken), which was incorporated into the Territory of the Saar Basin after the end of the First World War as the districts (Landkreise) of Homburg and Sankt Ingbert. After the Second World War there were smaller losses of territory to the Saar Protectorate, especially in the area of Sankt Wendel. As part of the 1969 land reform the region designated as the Palatinate with Rhineland-Palatinate had its northern border changed somewhat; the Diocese of Speyer and the Evangelical Church of the Palatinate still exist today largely based on the historical boundaries of the Circle of the Rhine. In 1974 the two Saarland districts were dissolved and their territory largely merged into the new Saarpfalz-Kreis (Saar-Pfalz-Kreis until 1989).

== History ==
The territory of the Rhine Circle, established in 1816, had been divided before 1792 into a total of 45 secular and ecclesiastical territories, some of which were very small. The largest were the Electoral Palatinate, the Duchy of Zweibrücken and the Prince-Bishopric of Speyer. The Electoral Palatinate and the Electorate of Bavaria had dynastic links through the House of Wittelsbach for centuries and from 1777 were ruled in a personal union under Elector Charles Theodore. The House of Palatinate-Zweibrücken was also a Wittelsbach branch.

In 1794, the Left Bank of the Rhine, including the Palatinate, was occupied by French revolutionary troops. As a result of the Treaty of Campo Formio (1797) the French First Republic annexed the region and introduced an administrative system in 1798. The subsequent Circle of the Rhine included considerable portions of the département of Mont-Tonnerre as well as smaller parts of the département of the Sarre and Bas-Rhin.

Following the defeat of Napoleon at the Battle of Leipzig in 1813 and the capture of the Left Bank of the Rhine by the Allies in January 1814, from 2 February 1814 the region was initially under the provisional authority of the General Government of the Middle Rhine, but, from 16 June that same year, it was placed under the administration of the Imperial-Royal Austrian and Royal Bavarian Joint Land Administration Commission (k. k. östreichischen und k. bairischen gemeinschaftliche Landes-Administrations-Kommission).

In the main treaty agreed at the Congress of Vienna in 1815, and dated 9 June 1815, Article 51 stated that (inter alia) on the Left Bank of the Rhine the former départements of the Sarre and Mont-Tonnere, except where stated in the same treaty, were to go "with full sovereignty" and ownership rights under the overlordship of the Emperor of Austria (Herrschaft Sr. Maj. des Kaisers von Oesterreich). The joint Austro-Bavarian administration was initially retained, however.

On 14 April 1816, a treaty was signed between Austria and Bavaria, in which the various territorial changes were agreed. According to Article 2 of the treaty, Emperor Francis I of Austria ceded various regions to Maximilian I of Bavaria. These included, in addition to various regions east of the Rhine, the following regions west of the Rhine:

In the Département of Mont-Tonnerre (Donnerberg):
1. the districts of Zweibrücken, Kaiserslautern and Speier; the latter with the exception of the cantons of Worms and Pfeddersheim;
2. the canton of Kirchheim-Bolanden, in districts of Alzei.
In the Sarre Département:
3. the cantons of Waldmohr, Blieskastell and Kusel, the latter with the exception of several villages on the road from St. Wendel to Baumholder, which were to be compensated, by another territorial transfer, with the agreement of the assembled plenipotentiaries of the allied powers at Frankfurt.
In the Département of Bas-Rhin:
4. the canton, town and fortress of Landau, the latter as a federal fortress in accordance with the regulations of 3 November 1815;
5. the cantons of Bergzabern. Langenkandel and the whole part of the Département Bas-Rhin on the left bank of the Lauter, which had been ceded in the Paris Tractat of 20 November 1815.

The effective date for these changes was stated as 1 May 1816.

In accordance with the prevailing Bavarian administrative structure, the region was given the name "Rhine Circle" (Rheinkreis) with Speyer as its capital. Of the former French administrative structure, the subdivision of the region into cantons, mayoralties and municipalities was retained.

As his first provincial governor, King Maximilian selected the Privy Councillor (Hofrat) Franz Xaver von Zwackh, whose name is responsible for the popular Palatinate nickname for Bavarian officials, Zwockel.

== See also ==
- History of the Palatinate: Bavarian period
