= Daniel Fenner von Fenneberg =

- Born: 1820
- Died: 1863 (aged 42–43)
- Military career
- Allegiance: Austria
- Branch: Army
- Commands: Vienna National Guard

Daniel Fenner von Fenneberg (c. 1820 – 1863) was an Austrian Army officer.

He served as an officer in the Austrian Army and commanded the Vienna National Guard in 1848. Later he was the Commander in Chief of the National Guard in Vienna in 1848. During the uprising of the citizens of Vienna in 1848, the National Guard fought on behalf of the insurgency in Vienna. In 1849, Fenner became Commander-in-Chief and Chief of Staff of the insurgent army of the Provisional Government in the Palatinate.
