= Provisorische Zentralgewalt =

Government of Germany 1848/1849

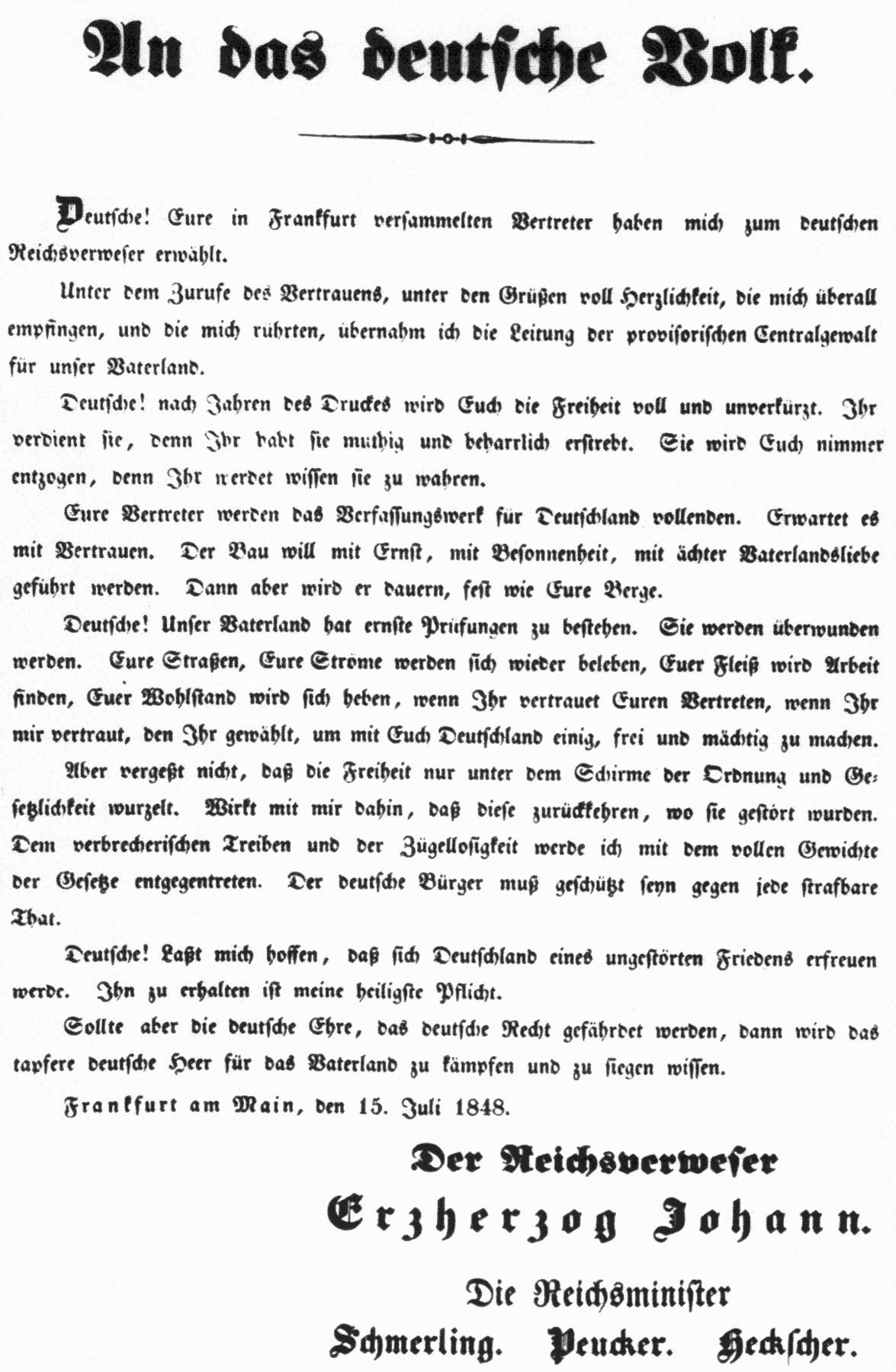
Proclamation of Archduke John as Reichverweser; 15 July 1848

The Provisorische Zentralgewalt (German: [pʁoviˈzoːʁɪʃə tsɛnˈtʁaːlɡəˌvalt], Provisional Central Power) was the provisional government of the Frankfurt Parliament (1848–49). Since this all-German national assembly had not been initiated by the German Confederation, it was lacking not only major constitutional bodies, such as a head of state and a government, but also legal legitimation. A modification of the Bundesakte, the constitution of the German Confederation, could have brought about such legitimation, but as it would have required the unanimous support of all 38 signatory states this was practically impossible. Partially for this reason, influential European powers such as France and Russia declined to recognize the Parliament. The delegates on the left wanted to solve this situation by creating a revolutionary parliamentary government, but, on 24 June 1848, the majority (450 – 100) voted for a compromise, the so-called Provisional Central Power.

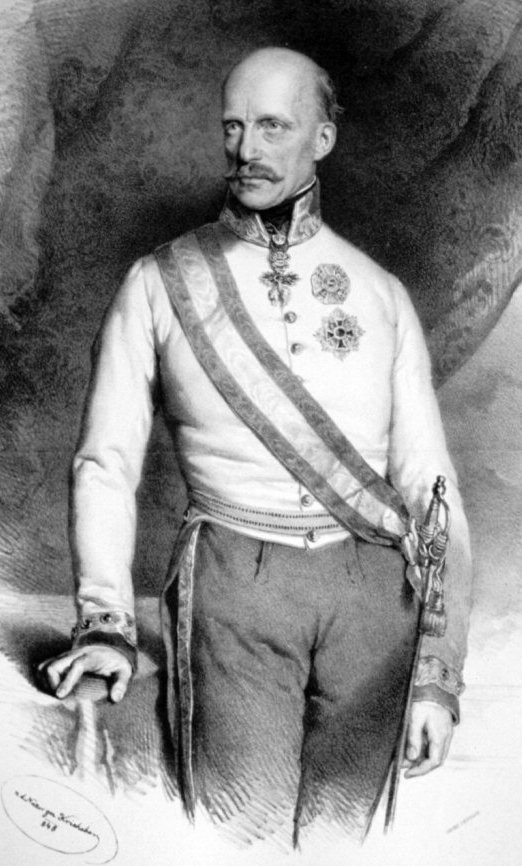
Archduke Johann of Austria (1848)

== Formation of the Central Power ==
On 24 June 1848, President of the National Assembly Heinrich von Gagern argued for a regency and provisional central government to carry out parliamentary decisions. On 28 June 1848, the Paulskirche parliament voted, with 450 votes against 100, for the so-called Provisional Central Power (Provisorische Zentralgewalt). The next day, 29 June, the Parliament cast votes for candidates to be the Reichsverweser or Regent of the Empire, a temporary head of state. In the final tally, Archduke John of Austria gained 436 votes, Heinrich von Gagern received 52 votes, John Adam von Itzstein got 32 votes, and Archduke Stephen, Palatine of Hungary only 1 vote. The office of Regent was declared "irresponsible", meaning the Regent could not govern except through his ministers, who were responsible to the Parliament.

The Parliament then dispatched a deputation to the Archduke to present the honor bestowed upon him. However, the Confederate Diet (Bundesversammlung) sent their own letter, which the Archduke received prior to the parliamentary deputation, informing him that the princes of the Confederation had nominated him Regent before the Parliament had done so. The implication was that the Regent should receive his power from the princes rather than the revolutionaries, but the practical effect of this power was yet to be seen.

The Archduke received the delegation on 5 July 1848 and accepted the position, stating, however, that he could not undertake full responsibility in Frankfurt until he had finished his current work of opening the Austrian Parliament in Vienna. Therefore, Archduke John drove to Frankfurt where he was sworn in as Regent on the morning of 12 July 1848 in the Paulskirche, and then crossed over to the Thurn and Taxis Palace to deliver a speech to the Confederate Diet, which then declared the end of its work and delegated its responsibilities to the Regent.

On 15 July 1848, the Regent appointed his first government under prime minister Prince Karl zu Leiningen, the maternal half-brother of Queen Victoria of Great Britain. Ministers of the Interior, Justice, War, and Foreign Affairs were appointed on the same day, while Ministers for Finance and Trade were appointed on 5 August. The Thurn und Taxis Palace, which had been and would again be the home of the Confederate Diet, was given over to the Regent and his ministers. Archduke John returned to Vienna on 17 July to finish his tasks there.

At the end of August 1848, there were a total of 26 persons employed in the administration of the provisional government. By 15 February 1849, the number had increased to 105. Some 35 of them worked in the War Department and had been employed by the Confederate Diet in the same capacity. The Ministry of Commerce employed 25 staff, including the section in charge of the German Fleet, which was only separated as an independent Naval ministry in May 1849. The diplomatic section employed mostly freelance personnel who held portfolios for state governments.

== Practical tasks of the Provisional Central Power ==
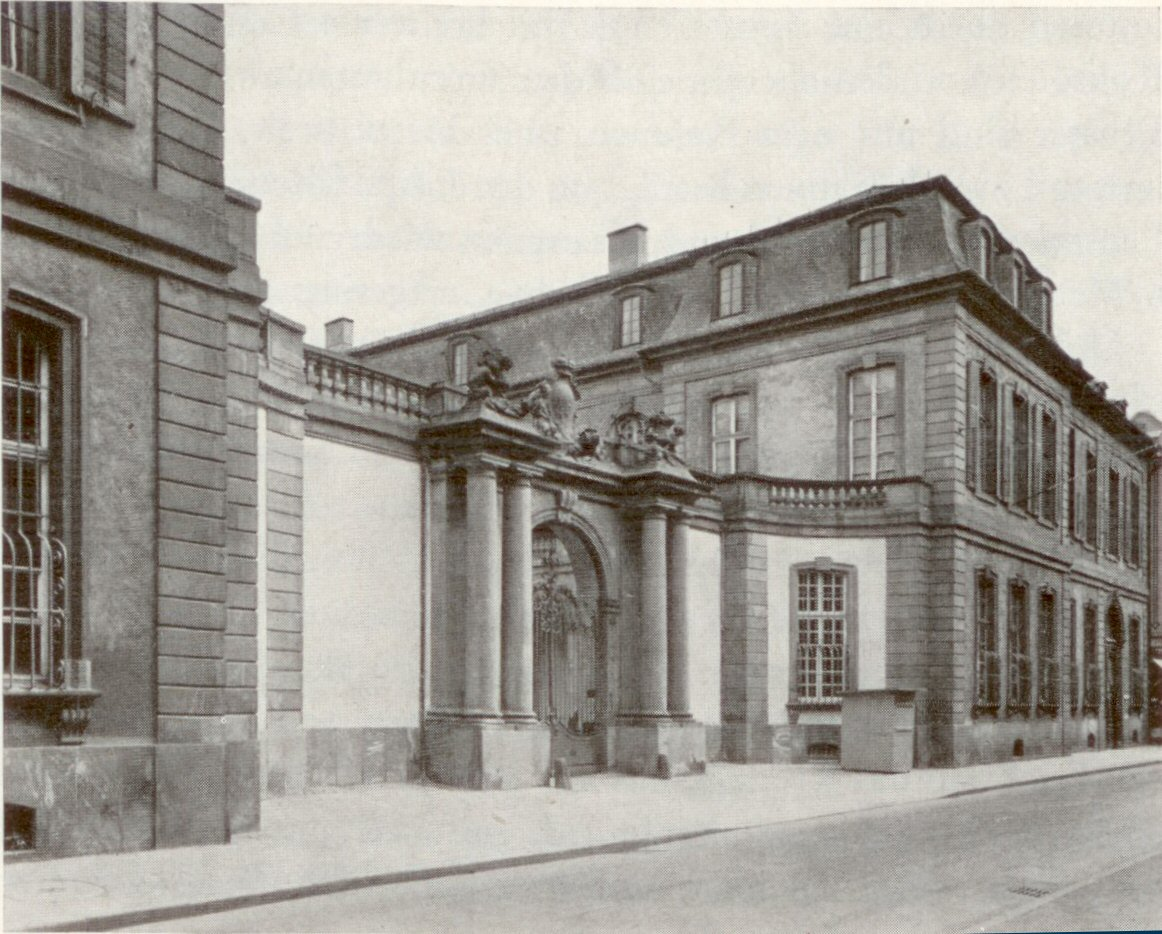
Palais Thurn und Taxis in Frankfurt was the seat of the Provisorische Zentralgewalt of the Frankfurt Parliament and of the Federal Assembly of the German Confederation

The practical tasks of the Provisional Central Power were performed by a cabinet, consisting of a college of ministers under the leadership of a prime minister (Ministerpräsident). At the same time, the Provisional Central Power undertook to create a government apparatus, made up of specialized ministries and special envoys, employing, for financial reasons, mainly deputies of the assembly. The goal was to have a functional administration in place at the time of the Constitution's passage. Whatever form the final government of united Germany was to take would be defined by the Constitution, and necessary changes to the Provisional Central Power would be made accordingly. Significantly, the terms of the Regent's service explicitly forbade him or his ministers from interfering in the formulation of the Constitution.

=== The German Army and Navy ===
On 12 July 1848, the Confederate Diet transferred responsibility for the German Confederate Army and the Federal Fortresses to the Provisional Central Power. The Regent appointed General Eduard von Peucker, Prussia's representative to the Federal Military Commission, as Minister of War. On 16 July, the Minister of War sent a circular to the state Governments with a proclamation to the German troops, in which he decreed the Regent as the highest military authority in Germany. The governments were to call out the troops of every garrison for a parade on 6 August, the 42nd anniversary of the end of the Holy Roman Empire. Their commanding officers were to read Peucker's proclamation before them, after which the troops were shout "Hurrah!" for the Regent three times. However, King Frederick William IV of Prussia forbade parading anywhere in Prussia on that date. Austria's Minister of War Theodore von Latour similarly refused to obey the order.

The creation of the German Navy was a consequence of Denmark's blockade of the North German coast in the war in Schleswig-Holstein. The vote passed overwhelmingly on 14 June 1848, and this date is still celebrated as the foundation of the modern German Navy. The Regent then appointed the Bremen senator Arnold Duckwitz as Minister of the Marine (Minister für Marineangelegenheiten) to develop a war fleet with Prince Adalbert of Prussia as Commander in Chief and Karl Rudolf Brommy as Chief of Operations. Difficulties arose in the procurement and equipment of suitable warships, as the British and Dutch were wary of a new naval power arising in the North Sea, and Denmark pressed its blockade harder. Furthermore, most German states forbade their trained personnel from serving in another navy, even though it was to be for their own common defense. Nevertheless, by 15 October 1848, three steam corvettes and one sailing frigate were placed into service. By that time, the Armistice of Malmö signed on 26 August had taken the pressure off German commerce. In total, two sailing frigates, two steam regattas, six steam corvettes, 26 rowing gunboats, and one hawk ship were procured from diverse places.

== Prime Ministers of the Provisional Government ==
- Anton von Schmerling (15. July 1848 until 5. August 1848)
- Carl zu Leiningen (5. August 1848 until 5 September 1848)
- Anton von Schmerling (24 September 1848 until 15 December 1848)
- Heinrich von Gagern (17 December 1848 until 10 May 1849)
- Maximilian Grävell (16 May 1849 until 3 June 1849)
- August Ludwig zu Sayn-Wittgenstein-Berleburg (3 June 1849 to 20 December 1849)

A list of ministers can be found on de:Liste der Reichsminister 1848/1849.

== Financial problems ==
The war in Schleswig-Holstein caused deputies of National Assembly to vote for the creation of the Reichsflotte or Imperial Fleet on 14 June 1848. However, there we no funds to disburse for the project. Patriotic enthusiasm led to numerous penny-collections across Germany to help raise funds.

Actual monies for the Navy did not become available until the Confederate Diet dissolved itself on 12 July 1848 and the Federal Fortress budget (Bundesmatrikularkasse) came into possession of the Provisional Central Power. By 15 October 1848, three steam corvettes and one sailing frigate were placed into service. In consequence, however, the entire budget inherited from the Confederate Diet was spent. Discussions in the National Assembly for raising funds through taxes were tied into the Constitutional debates, and the Provisional Central Power could not convince the state governments to make any more contributions than what they had agreed upon in the Confederate Diet. Chaotic finances of such states as Austria, struggling with external war and revolutionary outbreaks, meant little or no payment was to be expected in the near future.

Effectively, the National Assembly and the Provisional Central Power were bankrupt and unable to undertake such rudimentary projects as paying salaries, purchasing buildings, or even publishing notices. The revolution functioned on the financial charity of individual Germans and the good will of the states, which grew thinner as the months passed. Nevertheless, as late as 18 May 1849, President of the Assembly Theodore Reh reported the following private contributions to the fleet: 50 Florins collected from donors in the Traunkreis, forwarded by Mr. Kamillo Wagner of Steyr; 42 Pounds 17 Shillings 6 Pence forwarded by Mr. Peters, the Hamburg Consul in Manila, Philippines; and 4 Thalers from a student in Leipzig.

== Relations with the National Assembly ==
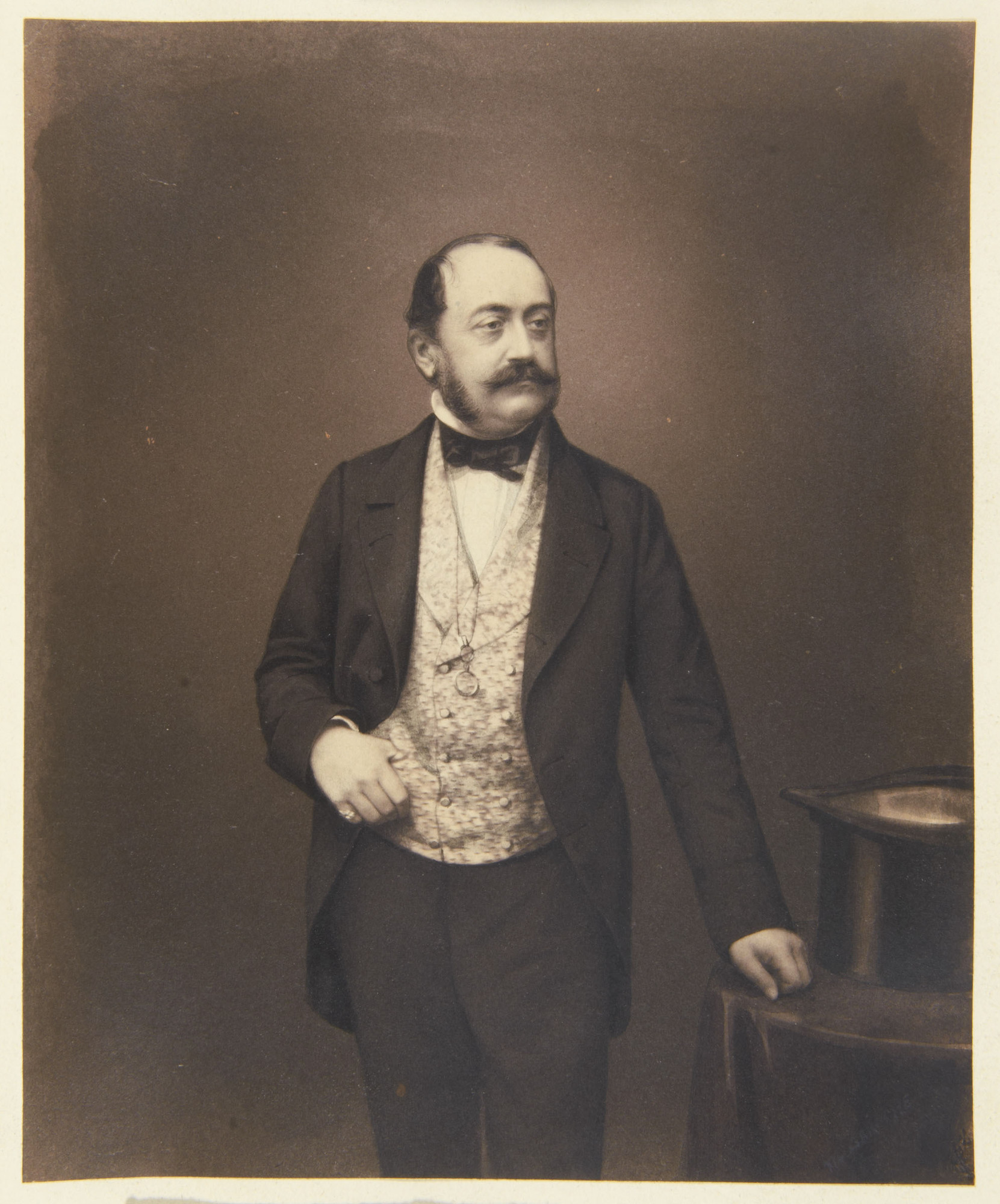
Prince Carl zu Leiningen, first Prime Minister

As the National Assembly had initiated the creation of the Provisional Central Power, the Regent and his government were expected to be subservient to their whims. Theoretically, the transfer of the Confederate Diet's authority to the Regent on 12 July gave him legitimate, binding power independent of the National Assembly. The Diet's rules regarding unanimous decision-making and a liberum veto had been a source of weakness when divided among 39 members. But, when concentrated in the hands of one man, it could make him supreme if he chose to be so.

However, the Regent was a man of advanced age who was convinced, like most of his contemporaries, that his office would be of short duration and his role should be strictly an honor. Therefore, the personalities of the Prime Ministers during the life of the Provisional Central Power clearly defined the government during their tenures. Leiningen was staunchly anti-Prussian and essentially anti-prince. His family had been mediatized along with hundreds of other nobles in the Napoleonic period, and he expected the remaining princes of Germany to set aside their crowns as well. His successor, Anton von Schmerling, held contempt for many of the institutions he had dutifully served, such as the Confederate Diet, and considered the National Assembly and his administration to be the future of Germany.

Yet, as the National Assembly dragged out its work on the Constitution, the role of the Provisional Central Power changed. Soon, its purpose was to shore up the diminishing legitimacy of the whole project in eyes of the people and the princes. Heinrich Gagern's appointment as Prime Minister in December was to serve that purpose, even though relations between the Regent and the former President of the National Assembly were poor.

== Passage of the Constitution ==
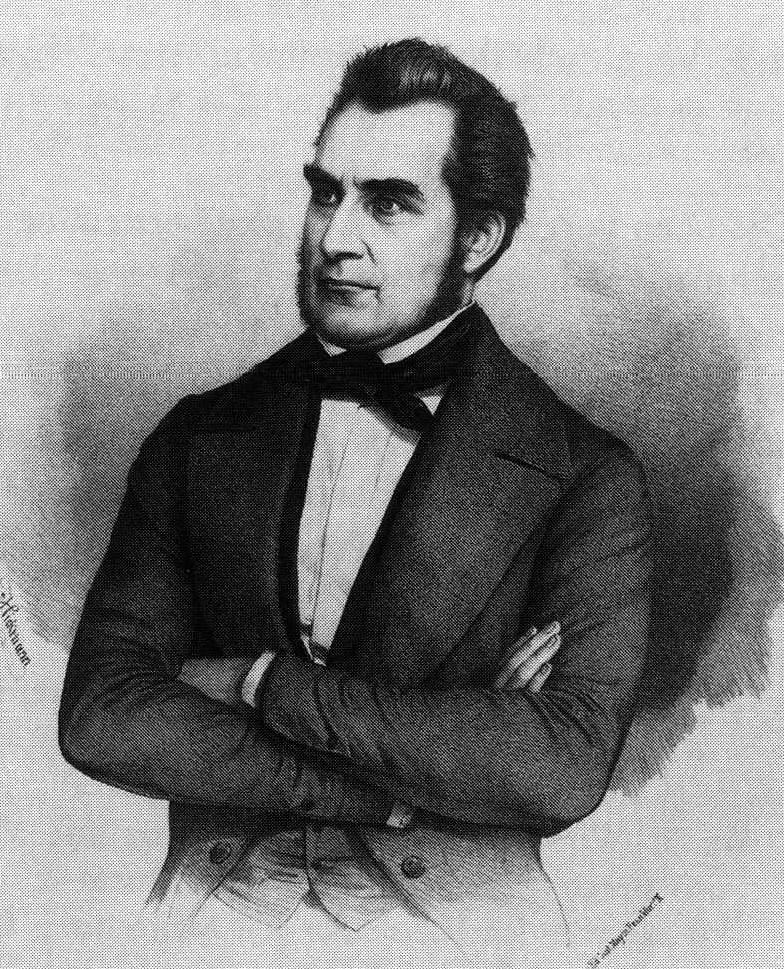
Heinrich von Gagern, third Prime Minister

As the near-inevitable result of having chosen the Smaller German Solution and the constitutional monarchy as form of government, the National Assembly elected the Prussian king Frederick William as hereditary head of state on 28 March 1849. Shortly after the vote, Archduke John offered his resignation as Regent, explaining that the vote ended all reason for his office. President of the Assembly Eduard von Simson was surprised by the act, and hastened to the Thurn and Taxis Palace where he requested him to remain as Regent until the coronation should occur. However, the Regent had already dispatched notice to King Frederick William, offering the Provisional Central Power to him ahead of his coronation. This act created something of a crisis, as possession of the office would be an important increase in Prussia's influence over the German Confederation, whether the King accepted the crown of Germany or not. Austria's Prime Minister Prince Schwarzenberg swiftly intervened, and convinced Archduke John to remain in office as Regent. This ensured Austria's role in German affairs did not diminish.

As it was, King Frederick William formally rejected the Imperial Constitution and the crown that was to go with it on 21 April 1849. Following Prussia's lead, the Constitution was rejected by the larger states and Gagern demanded that the Regent personally intervene to convince the Princes to yield. Reminding Gagern of his own terms forbidding the Regency from interfering in the work of the Constitution, he refused, and Gagern resigned in consequence on 10 May 1849.

== Break with the National Assembly ==
The Regent appointed the conservative Greater German advocate and National Assembly deputy Dr. Maximilian Grävell as his new Prime Minister on 16 May 1849. This so incensed the National Assembly that they held a vote of no confidence in the government on 17 May, resulting in a vote of 191 against 12 with 44 abstentions. Receiving moral support from Austria, the Regent stood defiant and retained his Prime Minister. Calls for the resignation of the Regent immediately followed.

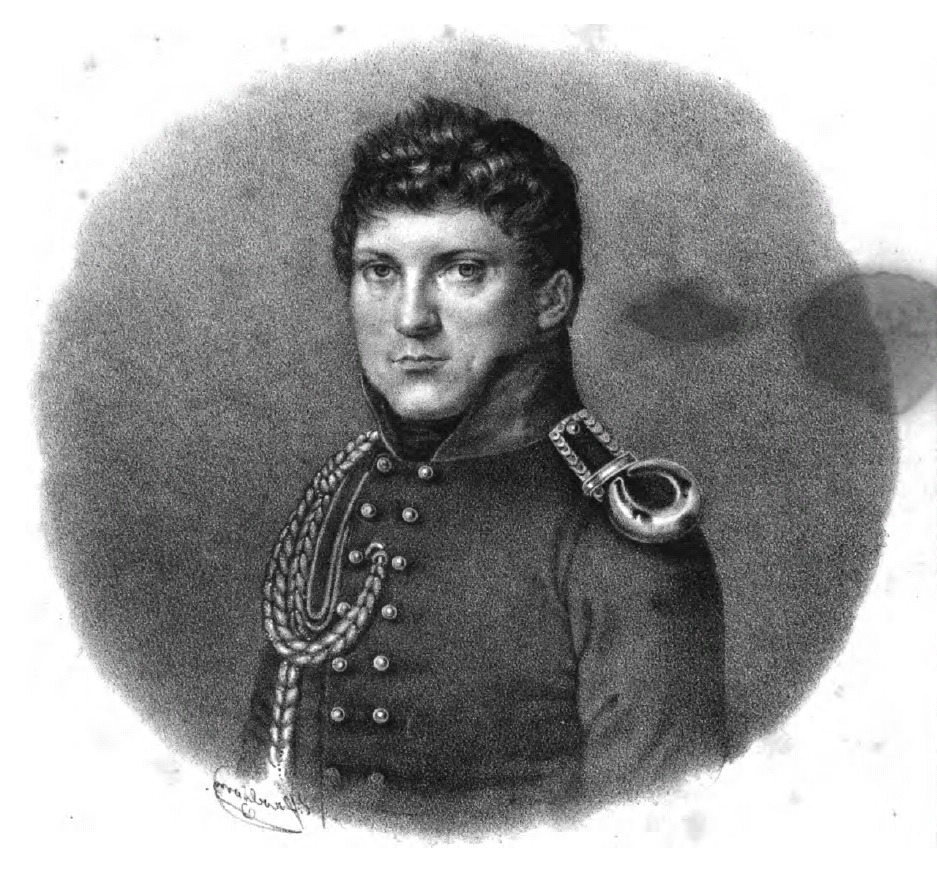
Dr. Maximilian Grävell, fourth Prime Minister

The next day, 18 May, Prime Minister Grävell ascended the speaker's podium in the Paulskirche and explained the Regent's motives for appointing him as Prime Minister, and the Regent's refusal to obey the National Assembly's decisions. Grävell defiantly stated that "The Regent can and will only return his office to the National Assembly from which it originated. But he will do so and cannot do otherwise, except as a staunch steward of the power entrusted to him by the [state] governments, and only to return this power back into the hands of the governments."

Great unrest answered Grävell's words, as the National Assembly was directly confronted with the statement that the Regent's power originated from the states, not the revolution. With insults and jeers raining down from the gallery, the Prime Minister concluded, "These, gentlemen, are the motives for why we came here, and why we cannot resign, in spite of your open distrust." The Prime Minister then departed. Deputy William Zimmermann of Stuttgart shouted from the gallery, "This is unheard of in the history of the world!"

After reading the rules of the Provisional Central Power, adopted 28 June and 4 September 1848, especially those articles that address the removal of ministers and the Regent, President Theodore Reh of the National Assembly read the report from the Committee of Thirty that drafted a provisional government (Reichsregentschaft) to replace the Regency. The vote passed with a majority (126 to 116 votes) for the plan with a provisional governor (Reichstatthalter) to replace the Regent. However, spreading rebellion in the Palatinate caused the Regent to call out Confederate troops to occupy Frankfurt. Threatened by the show of force, the National Assembly voted to close and remove to Stuttgart before a governor could be appointed. (See Provisional Rump Parliament and Dissolution.)

== In opposition to the Reichsregentschaft ==
With the closing of the National Assembly in Frankfurt, the Provisional Central Power was henceforth in opposition to the revolution that had created it. With the appointment of Sayn-Wittgenstein-Berleburg as Prime Minister, the Regent placed a staunchly conservative pro-Austrian candidate to steer the Provisional Central Power back toward the Confederate Diet.

Because the Regent and Provisional Central Power did not acknowledge the decisions of the National Assembly, the first business of the parliament when it reconvened in Stuttgart was to declare both dismissed and proclaim a new provisional regency (Reichsregentschaft) led by five deputies Franz Raveaux, Carl Vogt, Heinrich Simon, Friedrich Schüler and August Becher, and fashioned after the Directory of the French First Republic. However, the Provisional Central Power maintained control over the bureaucracy and, more importantly, the armed forces. On 16 June 1849, the National Assembly declared the formation of a People's Army (Volkswehr) consisting of four classes from age 18 to 60. The Provisional Regency then called all Germans to arms in order to defend the Constitution of 1849. But the proclamation only hastened the dissolution of the parliament by the troops of Württemberg.

== After the National Assembly ==
After rejecting the Imperial Constitution on 21 April 1849, Prussia attempted to undermine the Provisional Central Power. King Frederick William intended to assume its functions after the Regent announced his resignation at the end of March. However, Prince Schwarzenberg had foiled Prussia's efforts to do so. Therefore, Prussia chose to support the Union Policy (Unionspolitik) designed by the conservative Paulskirche deputy Joseph von Radowitz for a Smaller German Solution under Prussian leadership. A draft dated 28 May 1849 created a league of the three kingdoms of Prussia, Hannover, and Saxony for one year in which to formulate an acceptable constitution for Germany.

With the dissolution of the National Assembly, those politicians who supported Gagern's Erbkaiserlich policy of a hereditary monarchy led by King Frederick William supported Prussia's Unionspolitik in the Gotha Post-Parliament and the Erfurt Union Parliament. This policy was based on Prussia's insistence that both the National Assembly and the German Confederation were defunct. However, Austria's policy was that the German Confederation had never ceased to exist; rather, only the Confederate Diet had dissolved itself on 12 July 1848. Therefore, the Austrian Emperor's position as President of the German Confederation was still in force.

Archduke John attempted to resign his office once more in August 1849, stating that the Regency should be jointly held by Prussia and Austria through a committee of four until 1 May 1850, by which time all of the German governments should have decided on a new Constitution. The two governments agreed in principle, and a so-called Compact of Interim was signed on 30 September, transferring all responsibilities of the Provisional Central Power to the two states, though not relieving the Regent of his office as yet. By signing this compact, Prussia tacitly accepted Austria's policy that the German Confederation still existed.

One week later, disagreements between the three kingdoms saw Prussia's project for a new federal German government fall apart. On 5 October 1849, Hannover argued for an understanding with Austria before a new Parliament could be elected and a new Constitution drawn up, and Saxony seconded the motion. On 20 October, both kingdoms ended active participation in the league's deliberations, isolating Prussia entirely. With Austria's position in Germany more and more secure, Archduke John was finally permitted to resign his office of Regent on 20 December 1849.

== See also ==
- Frankfurt Assembly
- Bundestag (Deutscher Bund)
