= Moritz von Hirschfeld =

Prussian general (1791–1859)

Karl Ulrich Friedrich Wilhelm Moritz von Hirschfeld (4 July 1790 in Halberstadt – 13 October 1859 in Coblenz), Prussian general, got his schooling in a military academy. In 1806, he entered into his father's regiment and participated in the unhappy campaign of that year. In 1809, he participated with his older brother Eugen in an uprising against the French occupation forces. This ended in their fleeing to England in 1809. Both joined the Spanish dragoons in their struggles against the French. His brother was killed in battle in 1811. Lieutenant Moritz received severe wounds two times in battle, and ended in French captivity. He escaped in 1813, under very dangerous circumstances. His 15 wounds made him barely recognizable when he received a medal for his actions. In 1814 he participated in the campaign in France as a lieutenant colonel in the Spanish army.

Hirschfeld returned to the Prussian army in 1815, and in the succeeding peaceful years climbed the ranks in the military. 1849 found him commander of the 15th division of the Prussian army under the command of the Prince of Prussia. He participated in the battles which drove the rebel army out of the Palatinate and into the arms of the [Baden] forces under Mieroslawski. After relieving the Landau fortress, which was in the hands of the officers who had not gone over, he led two divisions against Mieroslawski. At Waghäusel, he obligated that numerically far greater force to retreat. Then he participated in the battle at the Murg which obligated the rebel army to disperse and resulted in the collapse of the uprising.
