= Franz Sznayde =

Polish general

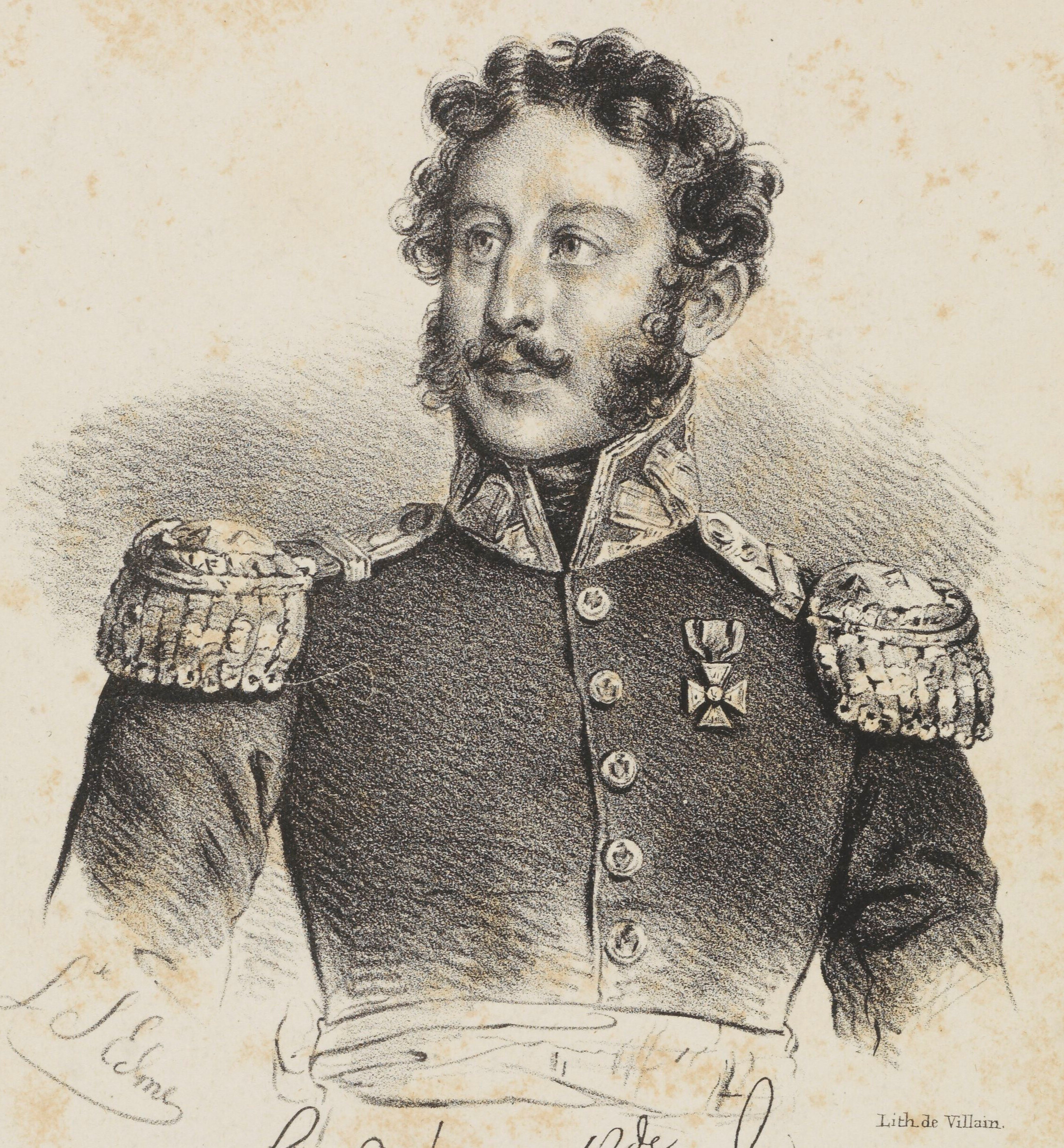
Franciszek Sznajde

Franz Sznayde (1790 Poland - 1850) was a Polish senior military officer.

Sznayde participated in the November Uprising in 1830 and 1831 by the Poles against the Russian Empire. In 1849, he became a general in the Baden-Palatinate insurgent army.

Sznayde died in 1850.

== Sources ==
- Sznajde Franciszek(in Polish)
- gen. bryg. Franciszek Sznajde (1790—1850)(in Polish)
