= Rastatt Fortress =

Coordinates: 48°51′30″N 08°12′38″E

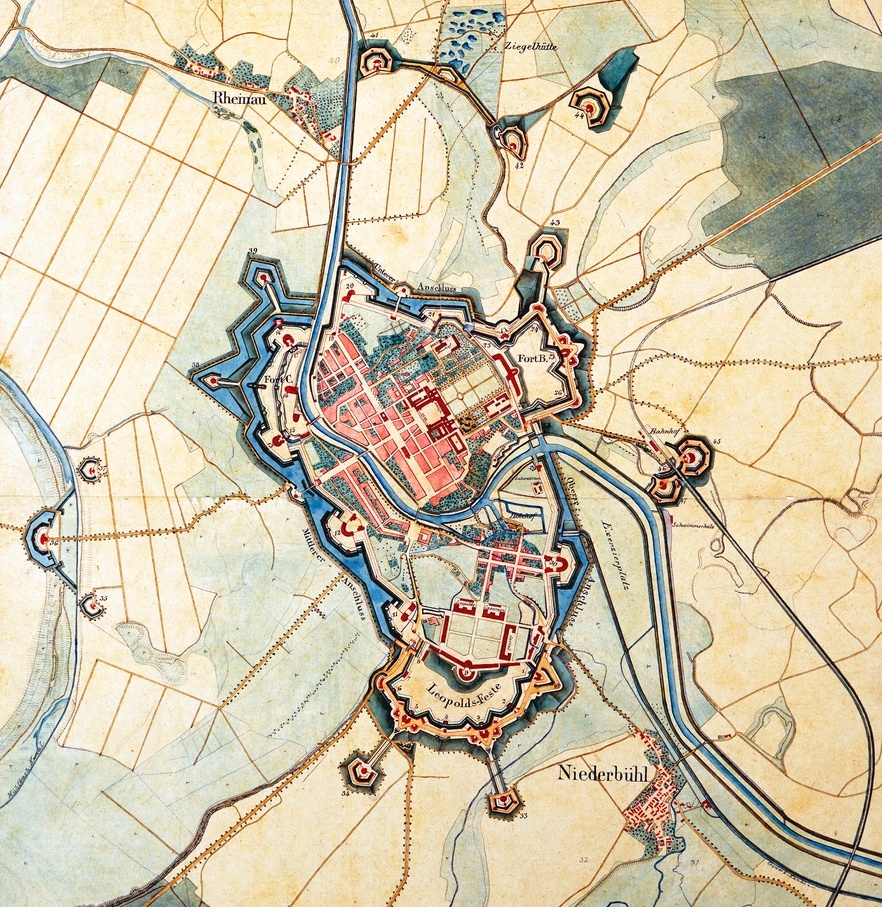
Plan of the fortress in 1849

Rastatt Fortress (German: Bundesfestung Rastatt) was built from 1842 to 1852. The construction of this federal fortress was one of the few projects that the German Confederation was able to complete. The fortress site covered the Baden town of Rastatt and, in 1849, played an important role during the Baden Revolution. It was abandoned in 1890 and most of it was eventually demolished.

== Background ==
On 3 November 1815, in the margins of the Paris Peace Conference the four victorious powers - Austria, Great Britain Prussia and Russia Mainz, Luxemburg and Landau were designated as fortresses of the German Confederation and, moreover, they envisaged that a fourth federal fortress on the Upper Rhine, for which 20 million French francs were to be set aside from the war reparations. As early as 1819 to 1824 a fortress construction commission was formed in which Baden, Bavarian, Württemberg and Austrian engineers jointly produced the plans, which were then shelved for 20 years for political reasons. Whilst Austria wanted to extend Ulm, Prussia and the south German states nearer to France favoured the construction of a fortress in Rastatt. In October 1836 the king of Württemberg, William I, proposed a compromise which was to build or extend both towns into fortresses. In 1838/39 Bavaria and Austria were won over. Not until the Rhine Crisis of 1840/41 did it happen, however, that the states of the German Confederation come to an understanding about defence measures against France and the federal assembly on 26 March 1841 agreed the construction of both fortresses. Rastatt was designated as a linking and border fortress, as well as an armoury for the VIII Army Corps. The Grand Duchy of Baden was given the right to appoint the governor, the commandant and the chief of artillery, the chief of engineers was to be appointed by Austria.

== Construction ==
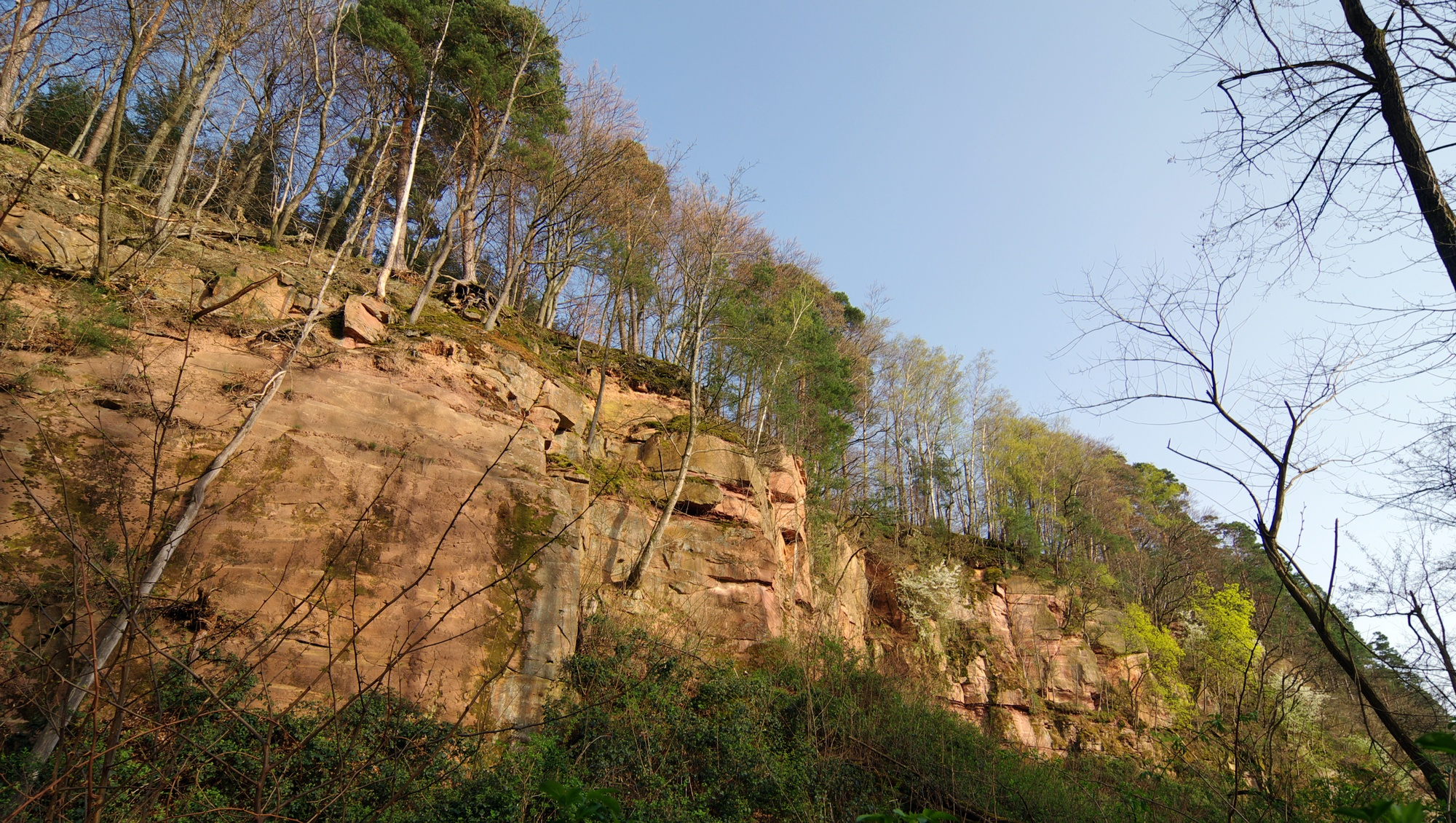
Fortress quarry on the Eichelberg

Work on the federal fortress of Rastatt began on 15 November 1842 although its foundation stone was not laid until 18 October 1844, because laborious preparatory work was needed. This included the purchase of parcels of land or their requisition in return for compensation. In addition, to municipal and royal land, the properties of 345 private individuals were bought or requisitioned for the fortress.

The construction of the fortress resulted in an enormous economic upturn for the town, which was later paid for however with the departure of public facilities such as the court (Hofgericht) and county council (Kreisregierung). The Austrian lieutenant colonel, Georg Eberle was appointed as the senior fortress construction engineer and almost all the management staff were from Austria. The large number of construction workers employed (in 1844 4,000) made the expansion of municipal infrastructure (police and medical services) necessary, the financing of which caused disputes between the town, the grand duchy and federal military authorities. The majority of the construction stone came from a roughly 500-metre-long bunter sandstone quarry on the hill of Eichelberg near Oberweier and was transported to Rastatt on a 14.5-kilometre-long, horse-drawn wagonway, its capacity being 400 cubic metres per day. In the quarry 400-1200 workers were employed, for whom a special hutted camp was built. In addition to locals, there were workers from Württemberg, Austria, South Tyrol and Italy. It was planned to complete the construction in 1849, but this did not come to fruition due to financial problems and the intervention of the Baden Revolution.

In 1848 the fortress was opened with the appointment of its first governor, Lieutenant General Carl Felix von Lassolaye.

Following its interruption by the Baden Revolution in 1849, work restarted in 1850, but came to a provisional halt in 1852. After serious disputes over its further expansion and funding, especially between Prussia and Austria, – the town defences and the station lunettes were finished in the period 1852–1854, and, in 1856, two outworks were completed.

== Today ==
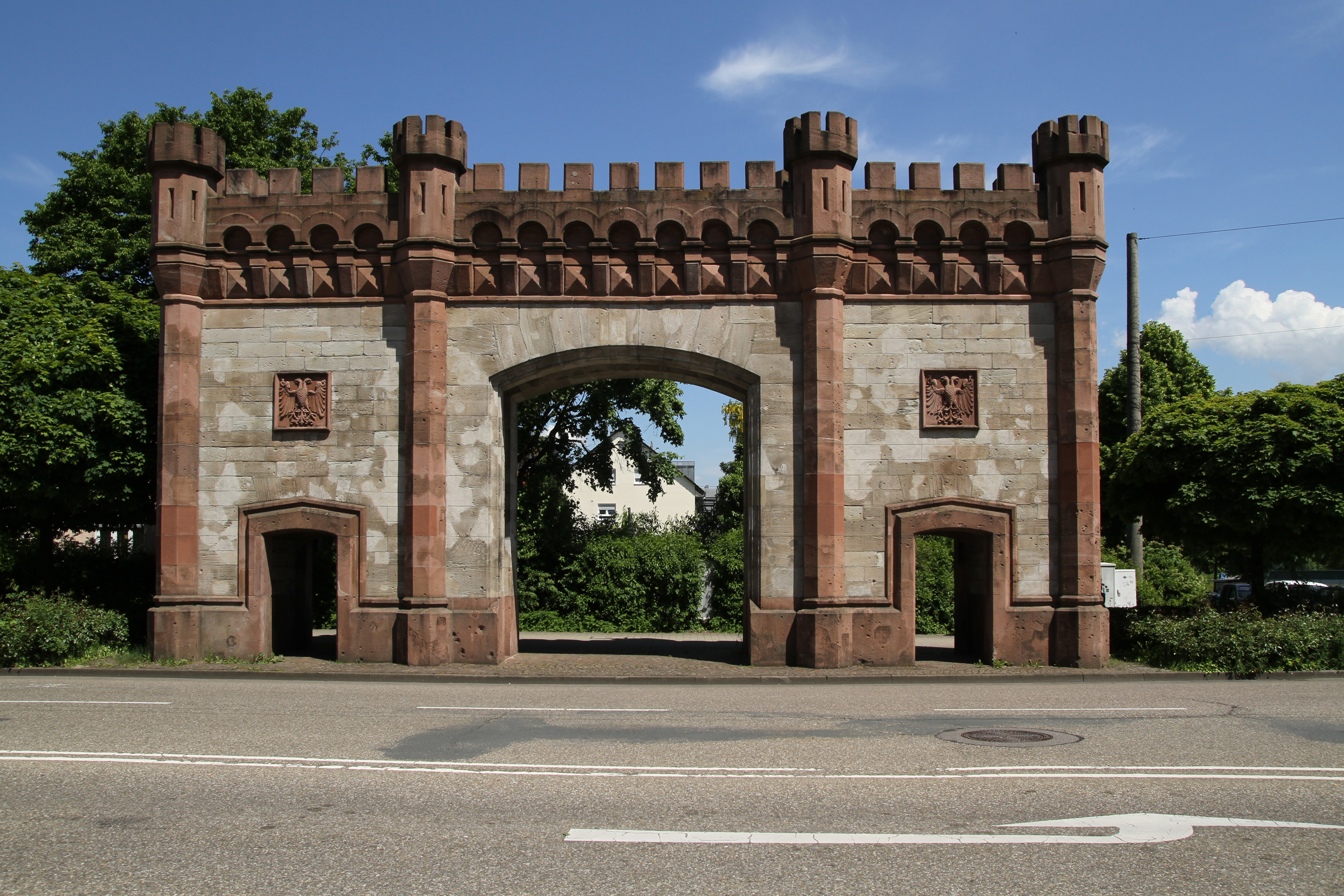
Karlsruhe Gate

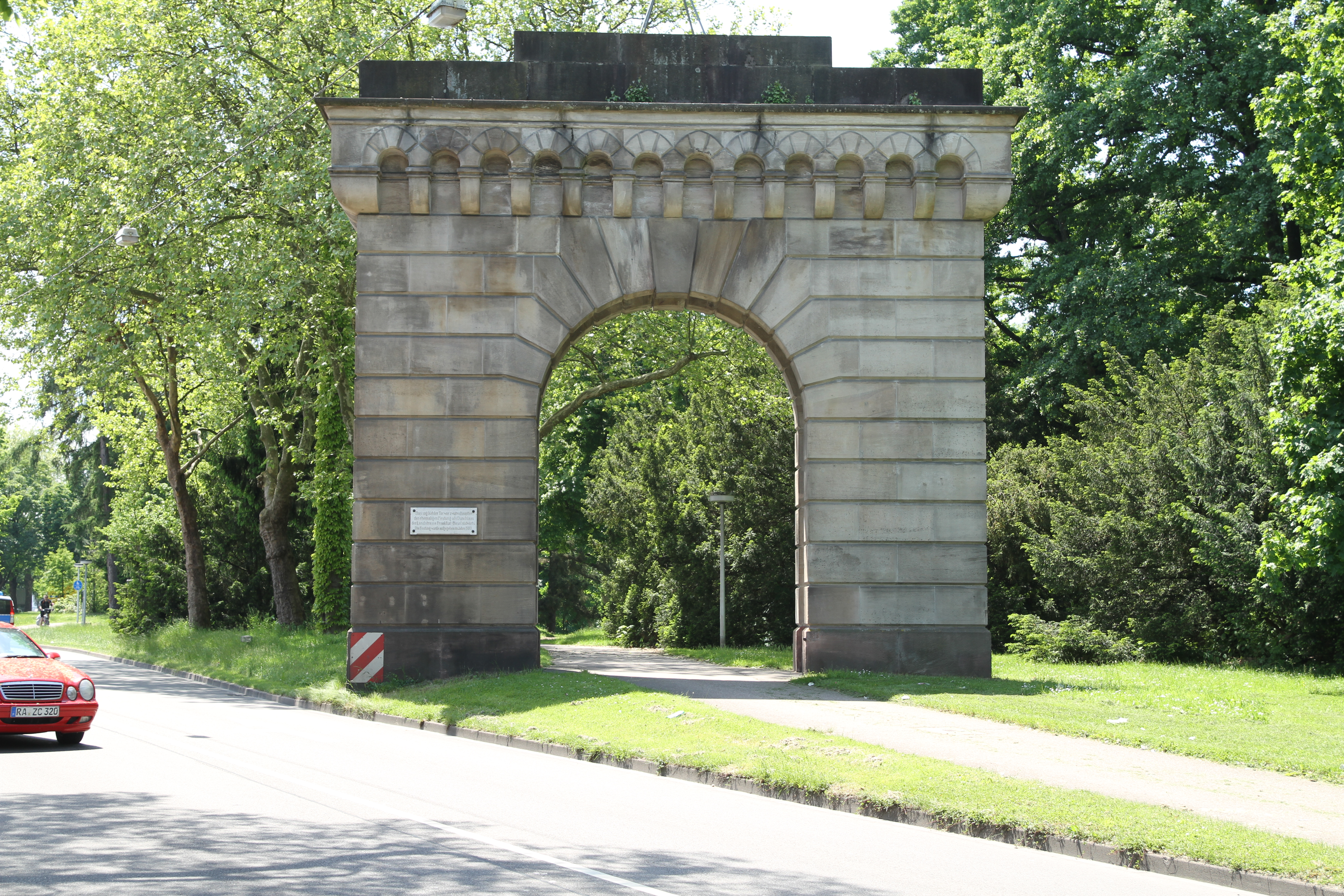
Kehl Gate

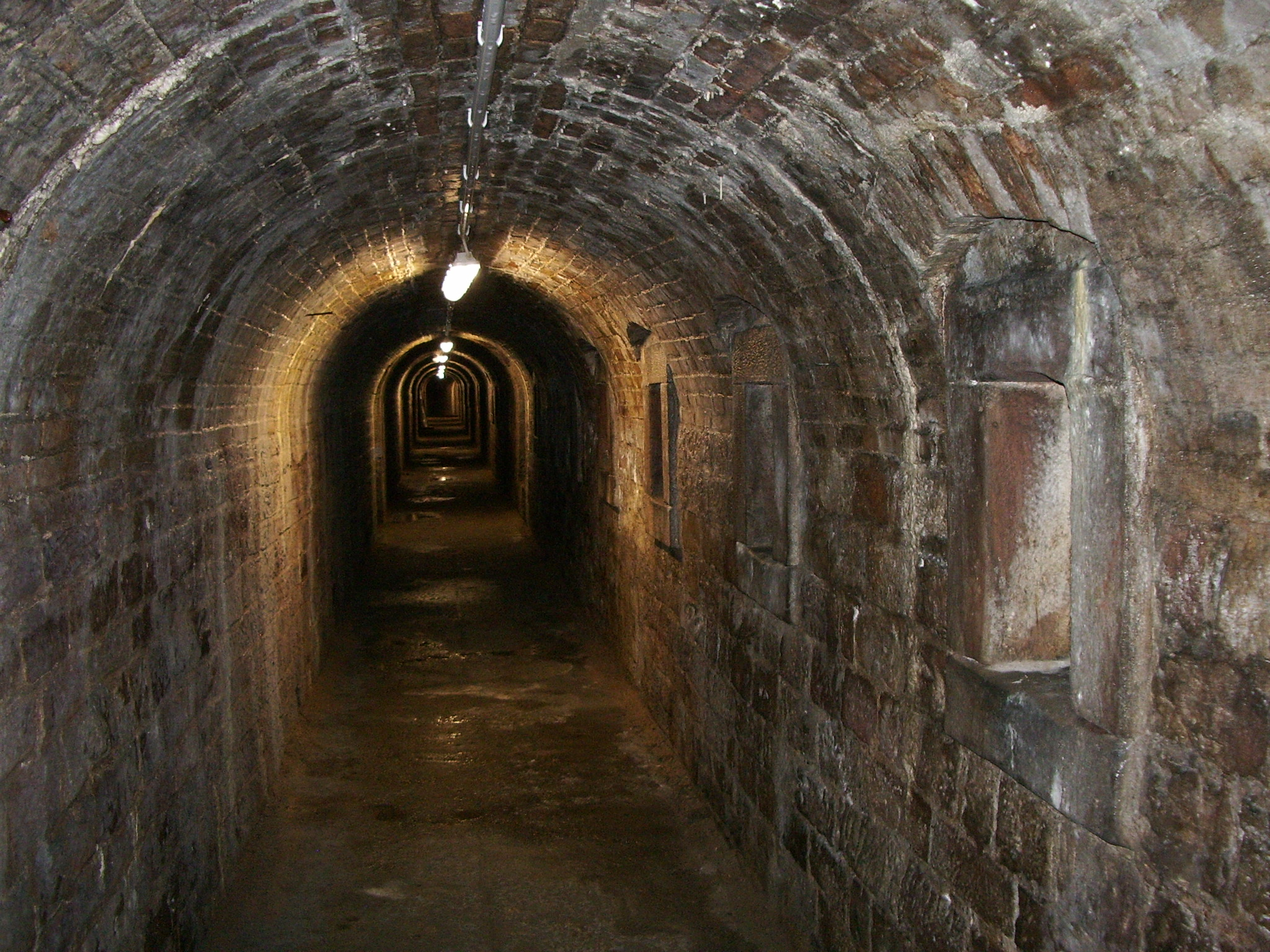
Casemates

Rastatt Fortress was abandoned in 1890, because it had lost its position on the border and hence its importance. The site was mostly sold in 1892 to the town of Rastatt as a source of construction material. After the German Empire had lost the First World War, it was laid down in the Treaty of Versailles in Article 180, that Germany had to slight its fortresses east of the Rhine along a 50-mile corridor. The Interallied Military Control Commission also laid down which remains of the abandoned Rastatt Fortress still had to be demolished.

The casemates are accessible and guided tours are offered. In the eastern part of the old Leopold Fortress 500 metres of passageway may be visited.

== Literature ==
- Wolfgang Dreßen (ed.): 1848–1849. Bürgerkrieg in Baden: Chronik einer verlorenen Revolution. (Wagenbachs Taschenbücherei, 3). Wagenbach, Berlin, 1975, ISBN 3-8031-2003-9.
- Gunther Hildebrandt: Rastatt 1849. Eine Festung der Revolution. (Illustrated historical issue No. 6, ed. by the Zentralinstitut für Geschichte der Akademie der Wissenschaften der DDR). VEB Deutscher Verlag der Wissenschaften, Berlin, 1976.
- Albert Neininger: Rastatt als Residenz, Garnison und Festung. Selbstverlag, Rastatt, 1961.
- Carl Schurz: Flucht aus der Festung Rastatt. Erinnerungen an die Badische Revolution. Mit einer Einführung von Helmut Bender. Waldkircher Verlagsgesellschaft, Waldkirch, 1983, ISBN 3-87885-086-7.
- Rainer Wollenschneider, Michael Feik: Bundesfestung Rastatt. In Erinnerung an die Grundsteinlegung am 18. Oktober 1844. Schütz, Ötigheim, 1994, ISBN 3-925418-44-X.
- Karl Alois Fickler: In Rastatt 1849. Mit einem Plane von Rastatt. Rastatt 1853 online at Google Books
- Karl Leopold Frhr. Schilling v. Canstatt: Die Militärmeuterei in Baden. Die Ereignisse in Rastatt, Bruchsal, Karlsruhe, Lörrach, Freiburg, Gundelfingen, Krotzingen, Neustadt etc. enthaltend. Aus authentischen Quellen zusammengetragen von einem badischen Offizier. Karlsruhe, 1849. (Full text UB Frankfurt)
- Carl von Rotteck, Carl Theodor Welcker: Staats-Lexikon – Encyklopädie der Staatswissenschaften. 3rd edn., 4th vol., Leipzig, 1860: Deutsche Bundeskriegsverfassung, B. Die Bundesfestungen, pp. 506–514. (online in der Google-Buchsuche)
- Marco Müller: Die Bundesfestung Rastatt. In: Badische Heimat, Heft 4/2005, pp. 499–515
- Karl Josef Rößler: Kampf um den Bau und die Besatzung der Festung Rastatt. In: Die Ortenau 42 (1962), pp. 264−273 online at the University of Freiburg
- Hermann Kraemer: Rastatt im Revolutionsjahr 1848/49. Gedenkblätter zur Jahrhundertfeier. Rastatt, 1949.
