= Bernhard Eisenstuck =

German politician and businessman (1805–1871)

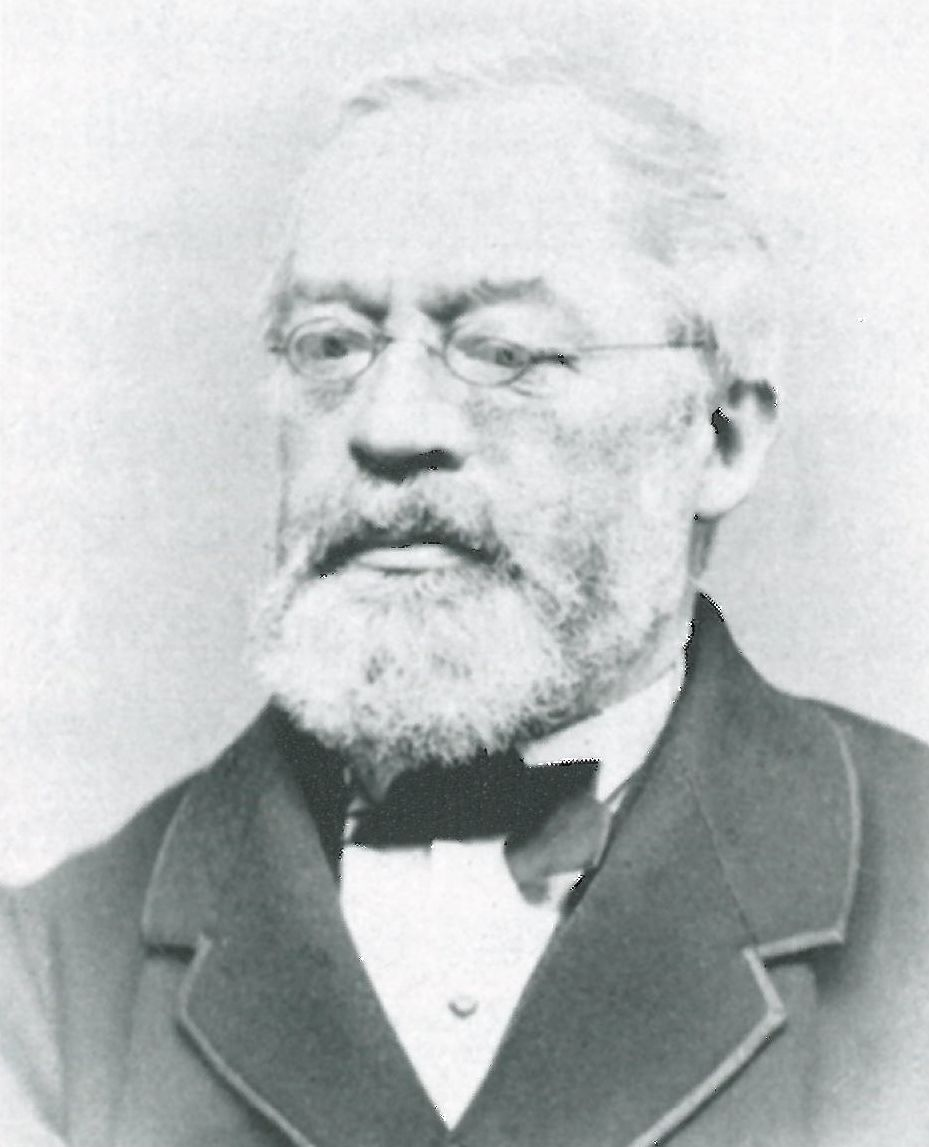
Bernhard Eisenstuck

Bernhard Eisenstuck (20 September 1805, Annaberg-Buchholz, Electorate of Saxony – 5 April 1871), factory co-owner and president of the Chemnitz town council, was a prominent agitator for a trade policy, when only in the sense of a protective tariff. In 1848, he was a member of the Frankfurt preliminary parliament (Vorparlament) and then elected from Chemnitz to the succeeding Frankfurt parliament where he sat on the left. In May he was sent as an imperial commissioner to the insurgent Palatinate, but recalled for overstepping his authority. He was vice president of the leftovers of the Frankfurt parliament (Rumpfparlament) when it emigrated to Stuttgart. Before its forced dispersal, he resigned and went to Belgium. After a long absence, he returned home and was a representative in Saxony's parliament where his name and decisive stance lent prestige to the thinly populated liberal ranks. He died as director of a thread-spinning factory.
