= Heinrich von Treitschke =

Historian, political writer (1834–1896)

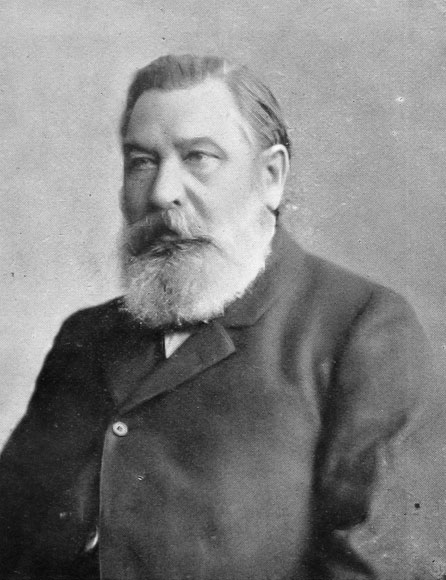
- Heinrich von Treitschke, c. 1895/96.
- Born: Heinrich Gotthard von Treitschke; 15 September 1834; Dresden, Kingdom of Saxony (now Germany)
- Died: 28 April 1896 (aged 61); Berlin, Kingdom of Prussia, German Empire (now Germany)
- Occupation: Historian
- Employer(s): Freiburg and Berlin Universities
- Spouse: Emma von Treitschke
- Children: Clara von Tungeln, and Maria von Treitschke

Heinrich Gotthard von Treitschke (German: [ˈhaɪnʁɪç fɔn ˈtʁaɪt͡ʃkə]; 15 September 1834 – 28 April 1896) was a German historian, political writer and National Liberal member of the Reichstag during the time of the German Empire.

He was an extreme nationalist, who favored German colonialism and opposed the British Empire. He also opposed Catholics, Poles, Jews and socialists inside Germany. According to Hans Kohn, Treitschke's "prominent position as a national scholar and popular prophet gave to anti-Semitism in Germany a recognized standing."

== Early life and teaching career ==
Born in Dresden. Heinrich von Treitschke came from a Saxon civil service and officer family and was of Evangelical Lutheran faith. His ancestors originated from Bohemia and, because of their Protestant religion, emigrated during the Thirty Years' War to the Electorate of Saxony after the Battle of White Mountain. His father was the Saxon lieutenant general Eduard Heinrich von Treitschke of the Kingdom of Saxony's army, who was ennobled in 1821 and who became governor of Königstein and military governor of Dresden. His uncle was the jurist Georg Carl Treitschke, and his cousin was the general Heinrich Leo von Treitschke. Treitschke developed an increasing hearing problem at a young age, which prevented him from entering public service.

He attended the renowned Dresden Kreuzschule (German for "School of the Cross") and studied history from 1851 to 1853 at the Rhenish Friedrich Wilhelm University of Bonn, where he joined the Frankonia fraternity in the winter semester of 1851/52. There he was influenced by the historian Friedrich Christoph Dahlmann. He then continued his studies at his father's insistence, focusing on state sciences and Kameralwissenschaft (cameralism) at the University of Leipzig. There he attended lectures by, among others, Heinrich Wuttke, against whom he developed a lasting, mutual dislike. Even as a student, he suffered from increasing hearing loss, which also made it difficult for him to attend lectures.

After studying at the universities of Leipzig and Bonn, where he was a student of Friedrich Christoph Dahlmann, in 1859 he established himself as a Privatdozent at Leipzig, lecturing on history and politics. For a time, he was very popular with students and attracted more than 200 listeners in 1861, but his political opinions made it impossible for the Saxon government to appoint him to a professorship.

At that time Treitschke was a strong Liberal; he hoped to see Germany united into a single state with a parliamentary government, and all the smaller states annexed. He praised colonialism, stating:

Every virile people has established colonial power. All great nations in the fullness of their strength have desired to set their mark upon barbarian lands and those who fail to participate in this great rivalry will play a pitiable role in time to come.

Treitschke also endorsed Social Darwinian theories of brutal competition among races. In an essay published in 1862, Treitschke praised the "pitiless racial struggle" of Germans against Lithuanians, Poles and Old Prussians; he claimed that "magic" emanated from "eastern German soil" which had been "fertilised" by "noble German blood". While his main objective was to give historical legitimisation to the Germanising of Poles in Prussia, he also praised the migration eastward performed by German ancestors that would eventually become a means of legitimising claims to further eastern territories.

He was appointed professor at the University of Freiburg in 1863. In 1866, at the beginning of the Austro-Prussian War, his sympathies with the Kingdom of Prussia were so strong that he went to Berlin, became a Prussian subject, and was appointed editor of the Preussischen Jahrbücher. His violent article, in which he demanded the annexation of the Kingdoms of Hanover and Saxony, and attacked with great invective the Saxon royal house, caused an estrangement from his father, a personal friend of the king. It was only equalled in its ill humour by his attacks on Bavaria during 1870. After getting appointments at the University of Kiel and the University of Heidelberg, he was made professor at Friedrich-Wilhelms-University (what is now named Humboldt-University) in Berlin in 1874.

Treitschke was influenced by Aristotle, Hegel, Wilhelm Roscher, Friedrich Christoph Dahlmann, and Rudolf von Gneist.

== Political career ==
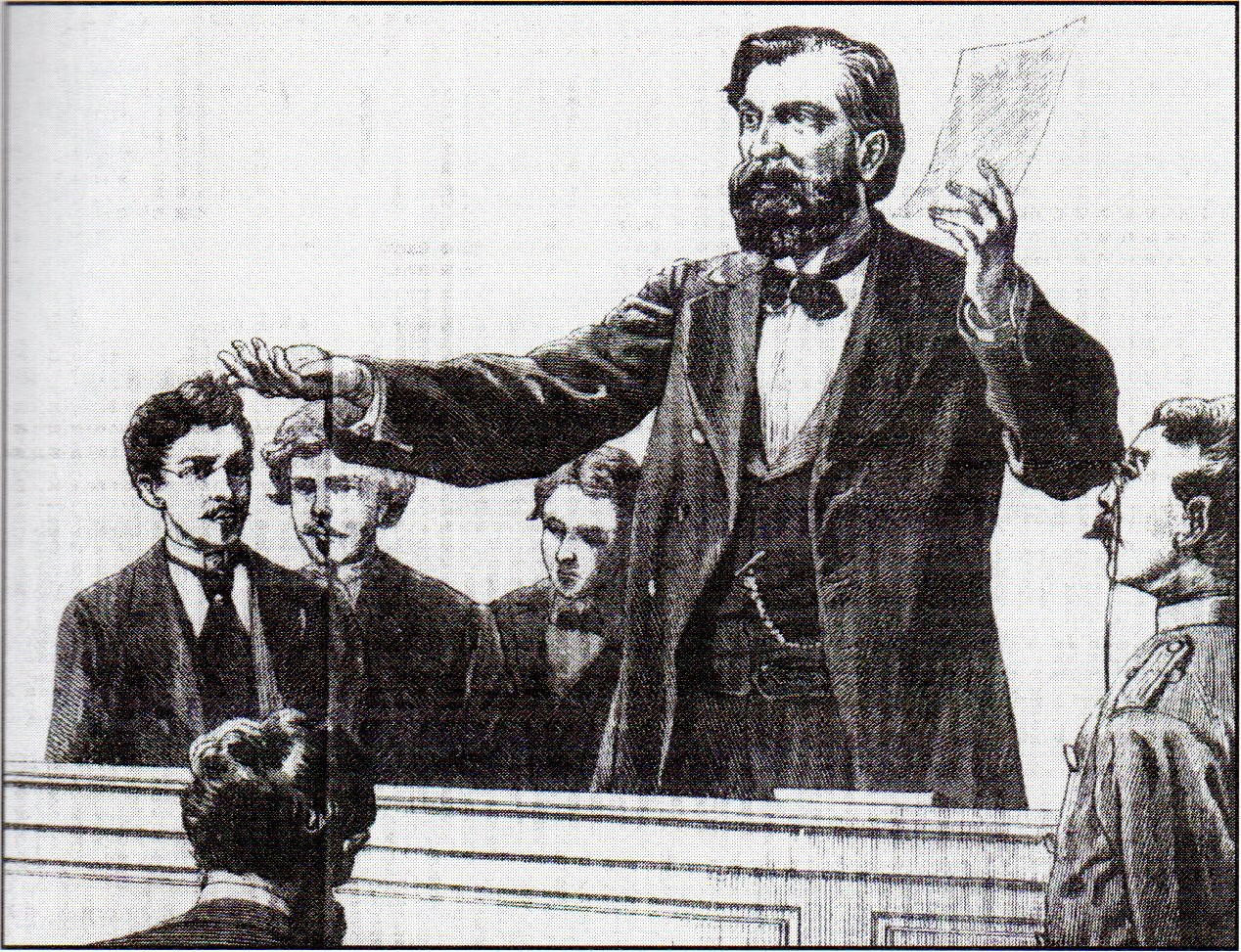
Treitschke in the lecture hall, drawing around 1879

Since 1858 Treitschke was an editor of the journal Preußische Jahrbücher, of which he later became co-editor. Initially, he held a liberal position and came into conflict with the Preußische Jahrbücher because they sided with the Prussian Minister President Bismarck during the Prussian constitutional conflict of 1863. After the founding of the German Empire in 1871, however, he joined the National Liberals and supported the Prussian state idea and Chancellor Otto von Bismarck, whom he had initially opposed as a liberal. In doing so, he saw above all, Social Democrats and Jews, but also liberal supporters of parliamentarization and representatives of the free thought movement as political enemies.

From 1871 to 1884 Treitschke was also a member of the Reichstag, until 11 July 1879 as a member of the National Liberal Party, and later as an independent. He was largely deaf during this period and had an aide sit by his side to transcribe discussion into writing so that he could participate.

He rejected objectivity in historiography and was later regarded as the embodiment of the politicized historian (hence the term Treitschke redivivus coined by Thomas Nipperdey). Treitschke placed his historical work in the service of political goals. His main work, the five-volume Deutsche Geschichte im Neunzehnten Jahrhundert (1879–1894), which breaks off rather than concludes with the depiction of the precursors of the Revolutions of 1848 in France, Italy, and Switzerland, legitimizes Prussian policy and its prominent position in Germany. At the same time, he attempted to delegitimize the independent existence of the southern German monarchies, especially Bavaria, by interpreting their sovereignty as the result solely of French policy.

Of the reforms of Maximilian von Montgelas, Treitschke took note only insofar as he could emphasise their deficiencies. In his historiography, the idea of a Franco-German hereditary enmity is constantly present, as he elaborated the contrast between German and French understandings of nationhood. According to Heinrich August Winkler: "The supposedly objective definition of the ethnic group stood above the subjective will of the individual; language and descent counted more than the decision for a political system." Regarding the incorporation of Alsace into the German Empire founded in 1871, he wrote: “We wish to restore to them, against their will, their own true self --- The Alsatians learned to despise fragmented Germany; they will learn to love us when Prussia's strong hand has educated them."

To contemporary readers, his numerous biographical sketches—of statesmen, writers, and other figures—were especially influential. Treitschke’s person-centred historiography is reflected in one of his most famous statements from his German History: Men make history.

Treitschke's German History went through many editions and was widely read among the educated bourgeoisie. The royalties made him financially independent. However, the work also provoked sharp criticism among fellow historians, especially from his former friend Hermann Baumgarten from 1883 onwards, who accused him of excessive bias towards Prussia and neglect of scholarly rigor, leading to a major controversy (Treitschke–Baumgarten controversy). Baumgarten's criticism was partly motivated by disappointment at the political shift of a former liberal ally. Treitschke was, however, defended by historians such as Bernhard Erdmannsdörffer, Gottlob Egelhaaf and Heinrich von Sybel, and Sybel's expert opinion led to Treitschke receiving the Verdun Prize in 1884 for the first two volumes of his German History, the most important historical award of the German Empire. Although disappointed by the criticism, Treitschke was encouraged by his publishing success and expanded his work beyond its originally planned scope to five volumes of around 800 pages each.

Treitschke exerted great influence on the generation of students who shaped German government and administration in the late Imperial period and even into the Weimar Republic. The hard-of-hearing Treitschke, who delivered his lectures passionately and loudly (and, due to near-total deafness, did not conduct seminars or establish a school of thought), was especially popular among Corps students. His vivid and rhetorically powerful lectures were often overcrowded, attracted listeners from outside the university, and became social events. His students included prominent figures and later representatives of imperialist tendencies such as Alfred von Tirpitz, Friedrich von Bernhardi, Carl Peters, and Heinrich Claß, as well as intellectuals like Friedrich Meinecke, Erich Marcks, Gustav Beckmann, Karl Liebknecht, W. E. B. Du Bois, and Georg Simmel. Women were not admitted to his lectures. When the women’s rights activist Helene Stöcker asked to attend, he replied: “German universities have been reserved for men for half a millennium, and I do not wish to help destroy them.”

Treitschke supported the German monarchy and regarded monarchism as a historically evolved inheritance; he therefore strongly welcomed the unification of the Reich under Prussian leadership. According to Thomas Gerhards, he did not represent imperialist ideology; however, at the beginning of the First World War, British historians in particular regarded him as one of the key representatives of German imperialism, drawing on transcripts of his lectures (especially his book Politik). The British, to whom Treitschke had once remarked in a frequently quoted statement that they confused "soap with civilisation", saw him as a symbol of German militarism and placed him alongside figures such as Friedrich von Bernhardi and Friedrich Nietzsche.

Treitschke rejected the concern of the Enlightenment and liberalism for individual rights and the separation of powers, in favour of an authoritarian monarchist and militarist concept of the state. He deplored the "penetration of French liberalism" (Eindringen des französischen Liberalismus) within the German nation.

A strong proponent of German colonialism, Treitschke was a strong critic of the British Empire, and his condemnations were favoured by some German imperialists. His increasingly-chauvinistic Anglophobia in the late-19th century increasingly considered England as the strongest potential adversary of the rapidly-industrialising German Empire. The US historian Gordon A. Craig likewise regarded Treitschke as a thinker of German great-power ambitions due to his call for the "destruction of British naval power", and his emotionally charged, "violent" rhetoric. Treitschke's earlier positive view of England (he was a knowledgeable reader of British conditions and literature and wrote an essay on John Milton) deteriorated due to British opposition to Prussia in the Danish War of 1864 and the Franco-Prussian War of 1870, and was further hardened by his negative experience during his first visit to England in 1895. He nevertheless opposed war with England in the prevailing circumstances, despite recognising future conflicts as possible.

From the 1870s onwards, Treitschke vehemently opposed socialists such as Gustav Schmoller, and frequently attacked Catholics, Jews, and the English. In his influential essay Das deutsche Ordensland Preußen (1862; The German Teutonic Order Land of Prussia), he already contrasted Slavs, especially Poles negatively with the allegedly civilizing German influence of the Teutonic Order.

On Heinrich von Sybel's death, Treitschke succeeded him as editor of the Historische Zeitschrift. He had outgrown his early Liberalism and become the chief panegyrist of the House of Hohenzollern. He made violent and influential attacks on all opinions and all parties which seemed in any way to be injurious to the increasing power of Germany. He endorsed Chancellor Otto von Bismarck and his program to subdue the Socialists, Poles and Catholics (Kulturkampf), but the attempts were unsuccessful because the victims organized themselves and used universal male suffrage to their advantage in the Reichstag until Bismarck finally relented.

=== Berlin antisemitism dispute ===
Treitschke was one of the few celebrities who endorsed antisemitic attacks which became prevalent from 1879 onwards. He accused German Jews of refusing to assimilate into German culture and society and attacked the flow of Jewish immigrants from Russian Poland. Treitschke popularised the phrase "Die Juden sind unser Unglück!" ("The Jews are our misfortune!"), which would be adopted as a motto by the Nazi publication Der Stürmer several decades later. He made several antisemitic remarks such as the following:

The Jews at one time played a necessary role in German history, because of their ability in the management of money. But now that the Aryans have become accustomed to the idiosyncrasies of finance, the Jews are no longer necessary. The international Jew, hidden in the mask of different nationalities, is a disintegrating influence; he can be of no further use to the world.

The essay in which Treitschke demanded the restriction of what he perceived as the social influence of the Jews triggered the Berliner Antisemitismusstreit (Berlin Anti-semitism Dispute), a debate lasting until 1881, which attracted significant attention in the bourgeois public sphere of Germany. The core of Treitschke's polemic is directed against the alleged will of the Jews to assert their cultural distinctiveness aggressively against Germanness, which Treitschke characterized as ungrateful and insolent, since they owed their participation in the life of the nation to the emancipation granted to them.

The solution to the "Jewish question" was, in his view, the path of assimilation, which, however, had only been followed by a few individuals such as Gabriel Riesser or Felix Mendelssohn Bartholdy, while the majority of Jews resisted it. According to his political theory, he assumed that a Jew who possessed the will for full affirmation of his environment had the ability to absorb the German essence and shed the Jewish essence. Such a conversion to Germanness with all its spiritual values was in principle possible, but had to be demanded more decisively. Everything good in Jews, he believed, they owed to adaptation to the German world; Judaism itself, however, contained no positive force.

As a religion, it was rather an outdated relic possessing a dangerous characteristic for the nation-state, namely the creation of bonds of solidarity across national boundaries and the promotion of the formation of a supranational Jewish-secular network. The healthy main direction of history, by contrast, could only be realised in a modern nation-state with a Christian tradition. Judaism must never be accepted as an equal confession, since on this basis no national unity was possible, and ultimately the only alternative would be the expulsion of the Jews.

The racial doctrine, which at the time was stylised by antisemites such as Wilhelm Marr and soon after Eugen Dühring as the foundation of national ideology, was rejected by Treitschke. Although he too spoke of "mixed culture" as a "disintegrating" factor against which the healthy "Germanic" national sentiment must defend itself, he did not regard "blood mixing" between Jews and non-Jews as fundamentally bad, but rather saw it as a means of assimilation, since it "has at all times been the most effective means of balancing tribal differences." He did not sign the Antisemitenpetition circulated by his students during the antisemitism controversy, but he viewed the petition campaign sympathetically and only distanced himself from it in November 1880 under pressure from his colleague Theodor Mommsen. Treitschke's writings and lectures at the University of Berlin around 1880 in this controversy contributed significantly to spreading and making acceptable within bourgeois and academically educated circles the view that Judaism was fundamentally alien and hostile to the national unification of Germany.

Treitschke was sharply attacked by parts of the liberal press for his statements. His position led to many ruptures with colleagues such as Theodor Mommsen, Harry Bresslau, and Johann Gustav Droysen, and to a break with Jewish friends such as Levin Goldschmidt; even his close friend Franz Overbeck criticised him for this. He consistently distanced himself from "Radau-Antisemitismus" ("rabble-antisemitism"), but regarded it as a comprehensible consequence of the allegedly far too great influence of the Jews, thereby assigning them, in the sense of a Täter-Opfer-Umkehr (perpetrator–victim reversal), responsibility for anti-Jewish violence. He did not regard himself as an antisemite and referred in justification to his friendly relations with individual Jews (e.g. he delivered the funeral oration for his Jewish friend and fraternity brother Alphons Oppenheim). Treitschke even offered to contribute articles to Josef Schrattenholz's Antisemiten-Hammer, a publication series whose declared aim was to refute antisemitism.

However, Treitschke's views were radically nationalist, and within his understanding of the nation, Jews remained excluded as foreigners. Through his statements, Treitschke "removed the 'bridle of shame' (Theodor Mommsen) from antisemitism and made it acceptable to broad sections of the population who otherwise distanced themselves from 'rabble and mob antisemitism'." He thereby made "a significant contribution to making antisemitism socially acceptable within the bourgeoisie." The historian Heinrich August Winkler wrote: "Antisemitism penetrated more and more into the liberal bourgeoisie and gained a broad following among students. The social rise of antisemitism followed the social rise of the Jews: the number of academically educated opponents of Jews grew with the number of academically educated Jews."

Even Friedrich Nietzsche sharply criticised Treitschke. In Beyond Good and Evil (1885), he suggested that "it might be just and useful to expel the antisemitic screamers from the country"—according to Christian Niemeyer, this statement was aimed at Treitschke.

The historian Golo Mann characterised Treitschke's position as follows:

Simultaneously with Jewish emancipation, the new bourgeois assimilation, the new antisemitism appears. But at first it is not what we imagine it to be; it does not demand exclusion, but complete assimilation and modesty in assimilation; it demands exclusion only of those who do not wish to assimilate. I will give you a remarkable example of this view, this attitude, that of the German historian Heinrich von Treitschke. This great writer is generally regarded as an antisemite, and he was one; nevertheless, the Nazis could have made nothing of his antisemitism. Treitschke was a passionate, angry patriot, very decisive in his judgment, but with a fine sense of justice and truth; nothing false or mean would ever have come from his pen. And thus Treitschke saw only one possible solution to the Judenfrage in Germany: complete absorption of the numerically small Jewry into Germanness, abandonment of every separate Jewish way of life. He praised the Prussian Jews who had honourably fulfilled their military duty in the wars of liberation.

One consequence of the controversy was Mommsen's prolonged successful attempt to prevent Treitschke's admission to the Preußische Akademie der Wissenschaften (Prussian Academy of Sciences), as well as his participation in the editorship of the Historische Zeitschrift, on the grounds that he was more a publicist than a scholar. In 1895, however, Treitschke was finally admitted, mainly through the strong support of his ally Sybel. Mommsen then resigned in protest.

Treitschke was later appropriated by the National Socialists, and his antisemitic stance was intensified in the popular edition of his works initiated by Alfred Rosenberg through distorting abridgements, omissions, and in some cases completely rewritten passages.

Because of his prominent status, Treitschke's remarks aroused widespread controversy.

Treitschke was considered favorably by the political elites of Prussia, and Chancellor Bernhard von Bülow personally declared that he kept a copy of von Treitschke's book for "several years" on his desk.

== Death and legacy ==
In 1896, Treitschke died in Berlin at 61 and is buried at the Alter St.-Matthäus-Kirchhof Berlin.

Throughout his life, Treitschke endorsed militarism and racism, praised the conquest of other nations and eradication of inferior peoples ("Brave peoples expand, cowardly peoples perish") and claimed that people of African heritage were "inferior".

Endorsing the idea of exterminating conquered nations, he wrote:

In the unhappy clash between races, inspired by fierce mutual enmity, the blood-stained savagery of quick war of annihilation is more humane, less revolting, than the specious clemency of sloth which keeps the vanquished in a state of brute beasts.

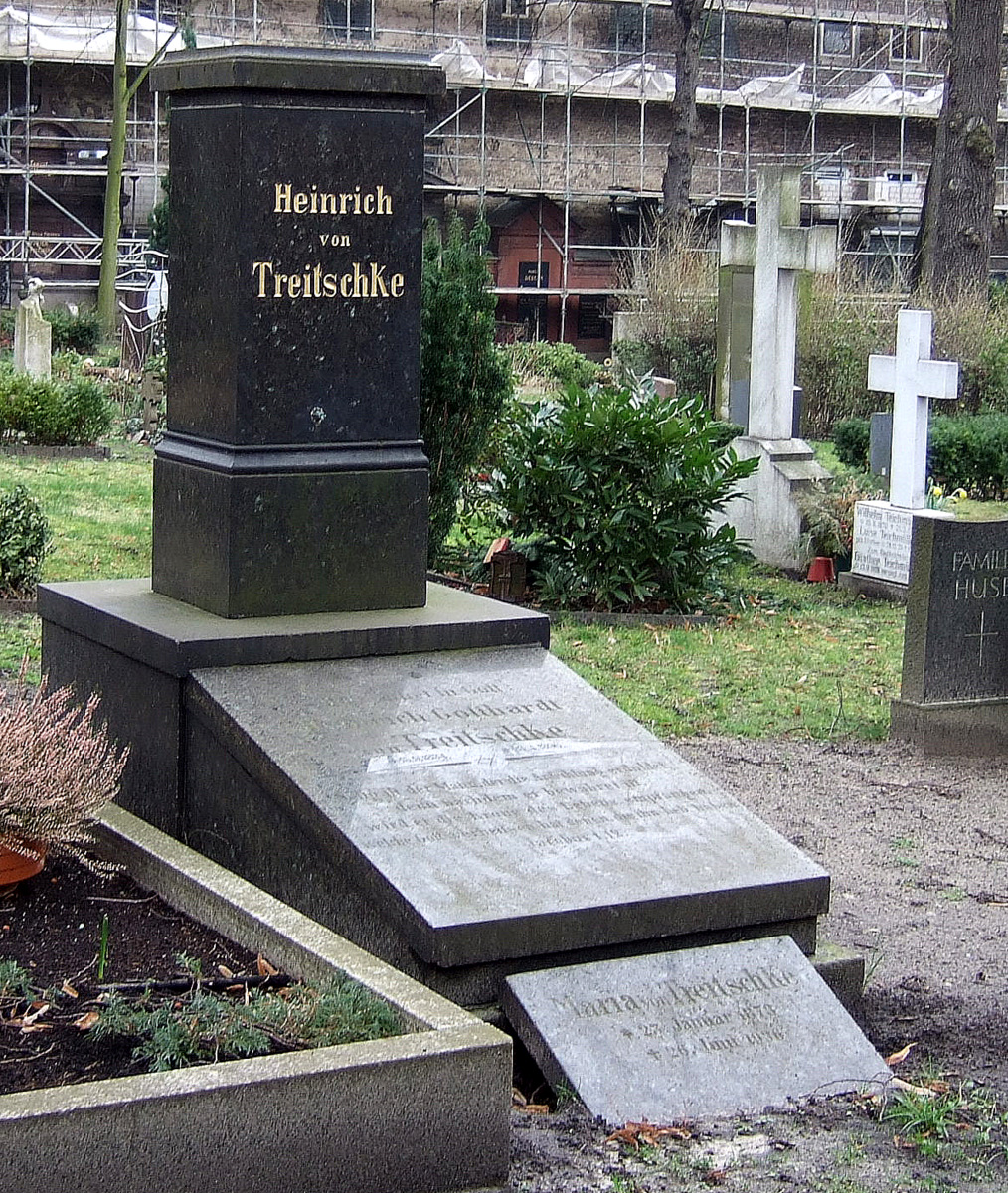
Treitschke's tomb in Berlin.

Treitschke considered political history as a German nationalist and emphasized periods of great political change. He was a patriotic historian devoted to Prussia. His great achievement was the History of Germany in the Nineteenth Century. The first volume was published in 1879, and for 26 years, four more volumes appeared. At his death, he had only advanced to 1847.

He also wrote biographical and historical essays, as well as essays concerning contemporary politics. The most important essays were collected as Historische und politische Aufsatze. A selection from his more controversial writings was made with the title Zehn Jahre deutscher Kämpfe. In 1896 a new volume was published, Deutsche Kämpfe, neue Folge. After his death his lectures on political subjects were published with the title Politik.

He also published in 1856 a short volume of poems named Vaterländische Gedichte and another volume the next year. His first works to be translated into English were two pamphlets on the War of 1870, What we demand from France (London, 1870) and The Baptism of Fire of the North German Confederation (1870).

Treitschke's students included Heinrich Claß, Hans Delbrück, W. E. B. Du Bois, Otto Hintze, Max Lenz, Erich Marcks, Friedrich Meinecke, Karl Peters, Gustav Schnürer, Georg Simmel and Friedrich von Bernhardi. During World War I, many writers in the West, particularly in Britain, blamed Bernhardi for creating attitudes among the political class of Germany that were considered an incitement to war. This opinion was repeated by historians such as Fritz Fischer, who deemed him a major influence on decision-makers before World War I.

A complete translation of both volumes of Treitschke's Politics was published in London in 1916. Politics was published in 1963 in an abridged English translation edited by Hans Kohn.

== Bibliography ==
- Treitschke, Heinrich Von. Germany, France, Russia and Islam (1876; translated 1915, reprint translation 2013), selected essays in English
- Treitschke, Heinrich von, Treitschke, his life and works, 1914; online
- Heinrich von Treitschke. German history in the nineteenth century: Volume 1 (5th ed 1894; translated 1915); vol 1 online, vol 2 online; vol 3 online; vol 4 online; vol 5 online; vol 6 online; vol 7 online
- Heinrich von Treitschke. Germany, France, Russia, & Islam (1915); online
- Heinrich von Treitschke. Politics (English edition 1916); Volume One; Volume Two

== See also ==
- Essentialist nationalism
