= Lavant =

Lavant may refer to:

- Lavant, Tyrol, Austria, a municipality
- Lavant, West Sussex, a civil parish
  - Lavant railway station
  - Lavant (ward)
- River Lavant, West Sussex, the winterbourne after which the village is named
- Lavant (river), Carinthia, Austria
  - Lavant viaduct, a motorway bridge over the river
- Lavant, Ontario, Canada, a community in the township of Lanark Highlands
- Roman Catholic Diocese of Lavant, a former bishopric, suffragan of the Prince-archbishop of Salzburg
- Christine Lavant (1915–1973), Austrian poet and novelist
- Denis Lavant (born 1961), French actor
- Rudolf Lavant (1844–1915), German writer

== See also ==
- Levant, a region in the Middle East
- Levant (disambiguation)
