= Carl Eduard Cramer (publicist) =

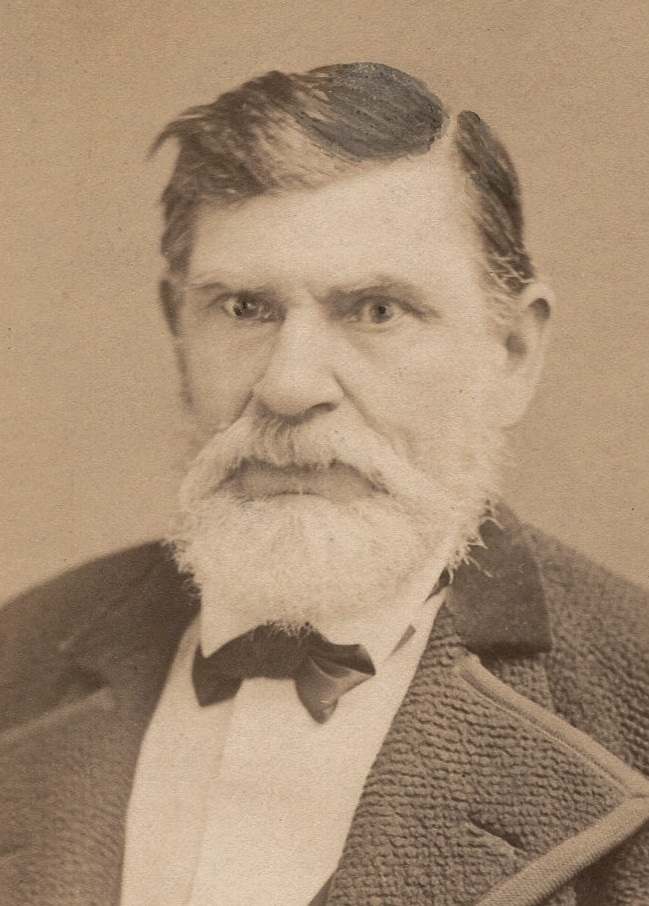
- Born: April 26, 1817; Langenbach, Pausa-Mühltroff, Kingdom of Saxony, German Confederation
- Died: April 30, 1886 (aged 69); Reudnitz, Kingdom of Saxony, German Empire
- Education: University of Leipzig
- Occupations: publicist, journalist, politician, proofreader, editor

Carl Eduard Cramer (26 April 1817 – 30 April 1886) was a German private scholar and lower-middle-class, democratic publicist in Leipzig.

In 1844, he took over as editor of the Sächsische Vaterlands-Blätter. He was one of the leaders of the moderate anti-republican wing of the Leipzig Fatherland Association and advocated for a "Constitutional monarchy".

== Life ==
Carl Cramer attended the Lyceum in Plauen (later a Gymnasium) from 1827 to 1834. In 1834, he moved from the Vogtland region to Leipzig to study theology and philosophy at the University of Leipzig from May 2, 1834, to June 1, 1839.

He was married on December 27, 1843, in St. Thomas Church in Leipzig to Friederike Henriette Dorothea Jacobine Wirth. His wife, Friederike Henriette Dorothea Jacobine, née Wirth, was the first cousin once removed of Johann Georg August Wirth. Carl Eduard Cramer was the father of Rudolf Lavant (actually Richard Cramer).

Carl Cramer was a member of the Leipzig Patriotic Union. He belonged to the provisional committee of this association, along with Robert Blum and Heinrich Wuttke. On August 17, 1844, Carl Eduard Cramer took over as editor of the Sächsische Vaterlandsblätter (Fatherland Papers). On December 23, 1845, the Vaterlandsblätter were banned. The Vaterlandsblätter did not reappear until April 1, 1848, when several publishers took over: Robert Blum, Carl Eduard Cramer, Johann Georg Günther, and Christian Friedrich Rudolph Rüder as editor-in-chief. Cramer edited the Vaterlandsblätter until 1850. On December 31, 1850, Carl Eduard Cramer ceased publication of the "Vorwärts Vaterlandsblätter".

Carl Cramer was a member of the Leipzig Writers' Association, founded by his friend Robert Blum. At the end of 1847, Cramer and the popular democratic politician Robert Blum began publishing a popular encyclopedia of political science, which was also Blum's most important article during his time as editor. Robert Blum was summarily executed by firing squad by the "victorious reactionaries" for his participation in the Vienna October Uprising of 1848. The close relationship between the two revolutionaries is evident from the fact that the martyr Blum wrote a letter to his comrade-in-arms Cramer on the morning before his execution.

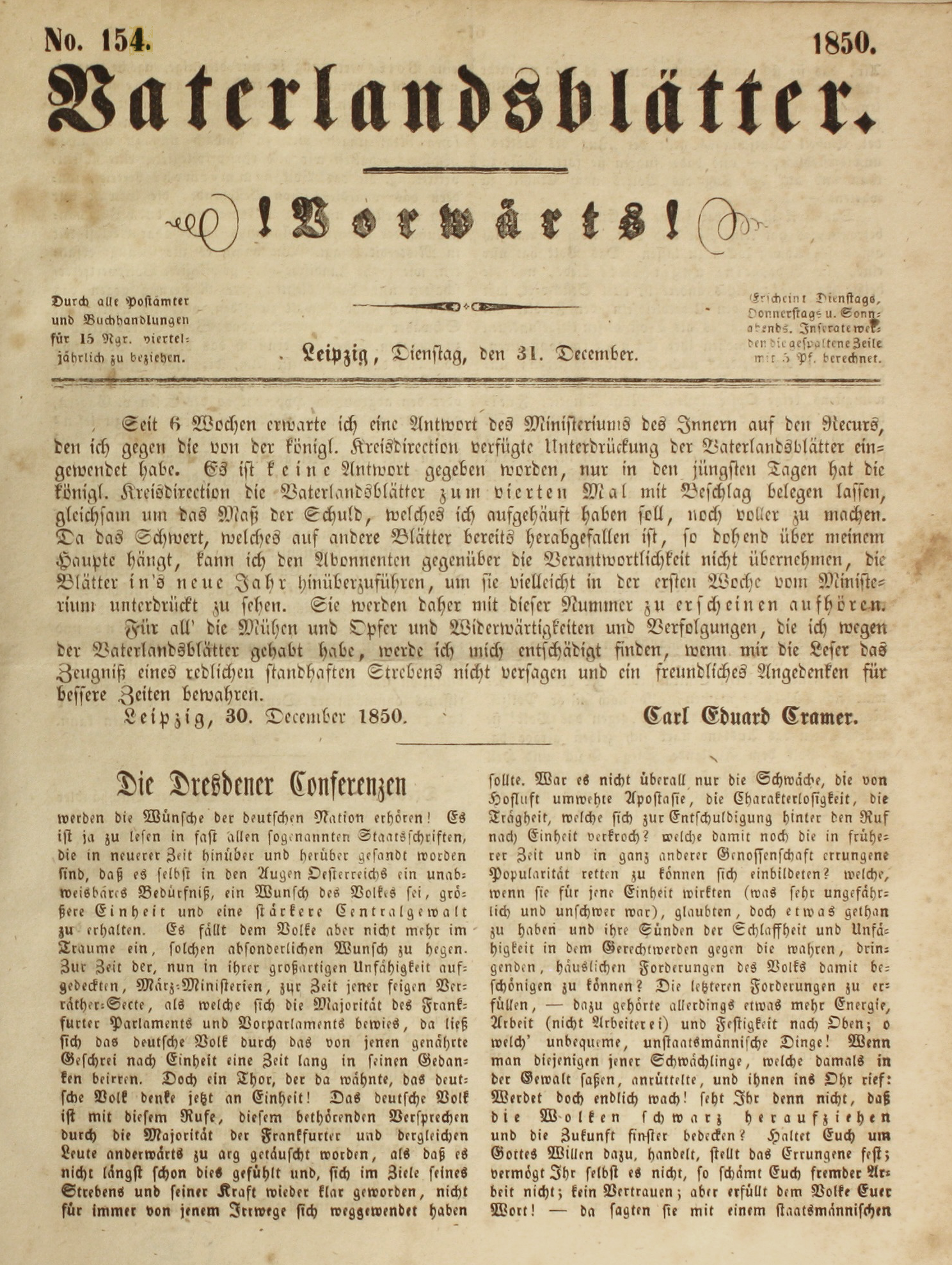
Vaterlandsblätter, last issue no. 154, dated December 31, 1850.

In 1849/50, the writer Cramer represented the 27th electoral district (Borna) in the II. Chamber of the Landtag of Saxony. Of particular note is his speech at the forty-third public session on March 6, 1850, on "The German Constitutional Affairs".

At the public assembly of 1866 in the large hall of the Odeon in Leipzig, which was directed against Prussia's warmongering against Austria, Heinrich Wuttke spoke first, followed by Carl Eduard Cramer, and other speakers included the still young August Bebel, Wilhelm Liebknecht, Friedrich Wilhelm Fritzsche, etc. On December 19, 1872, Carl Cramer, who had previously held the status of a protected relative, obtained the civil rights of the city of Leipzig.

Cramer probably earned the most from proofreading, either for magazines or for authors and their works. For example, Cramer worked as a proofreader for the "Leipziger Zeitung" . For decades, C. Cramer worked as a proofreader for the jurist and legal historian Professor Gustav Friedrich Hänel. In 1862, he proofread the history of French literature by Dr. Hermann Semmig.

Carl Cramer married as a private scholar and died as a writer at the age of 69 on April 30, 1886, in Reudnitz near Leipzig. He was buried in the "Neuen Johannisfriedhof" (now Friedenspark).

== Works ==
- Stimmen aus dem Vaterlande. Carl Eduard Cramer. Verlag: Robert Friese, Leipzig 1846, digital
- Ein fliegendes Blatt aus dem Vaterlande. Carl Eduard Cramer. Verlag: Robert Friese, Leipzig 1846, digital
- Ein fliegendes Blatt aus dem Vaterlande. Das Ministerium des Innern und – ich! Carl Eduard Cramer. Verlag: Robert Friese, Leipzig 1846, digital
- Sächsische Zustände. Carl Eduard Cramer. Leipzig 1847. In: Konstitutionelle Jahrbücher von Dr. Carl Weil, Jg. 2. Verlag Adolph Krabbe, Stuttgart 1847, S. 44–82. digital
- Sachsens Gegenwart und Zukunft. Ein Mahnruf an das sächsische Volk. Carl Eduard Cramer (Anonym erschienen) . Druck und Verlag: Roßberg’sche Buchhandlung, Leipzig 1866, digital
- Gerd Cramer (Hrsg.): Carl Eduard Cramer. Sein Leben und Wirken in Zeiten der Erhebung und des Umbruchs. Zum 200jährigen Geburtstag von Carl Eduard Cramer *26. April 1817 †30. April 1886. Westarp Book On Demand 2017. ISBN 978-3-86460-640-3
