= Max Wirth =

German journalist and economist (1822–1900)

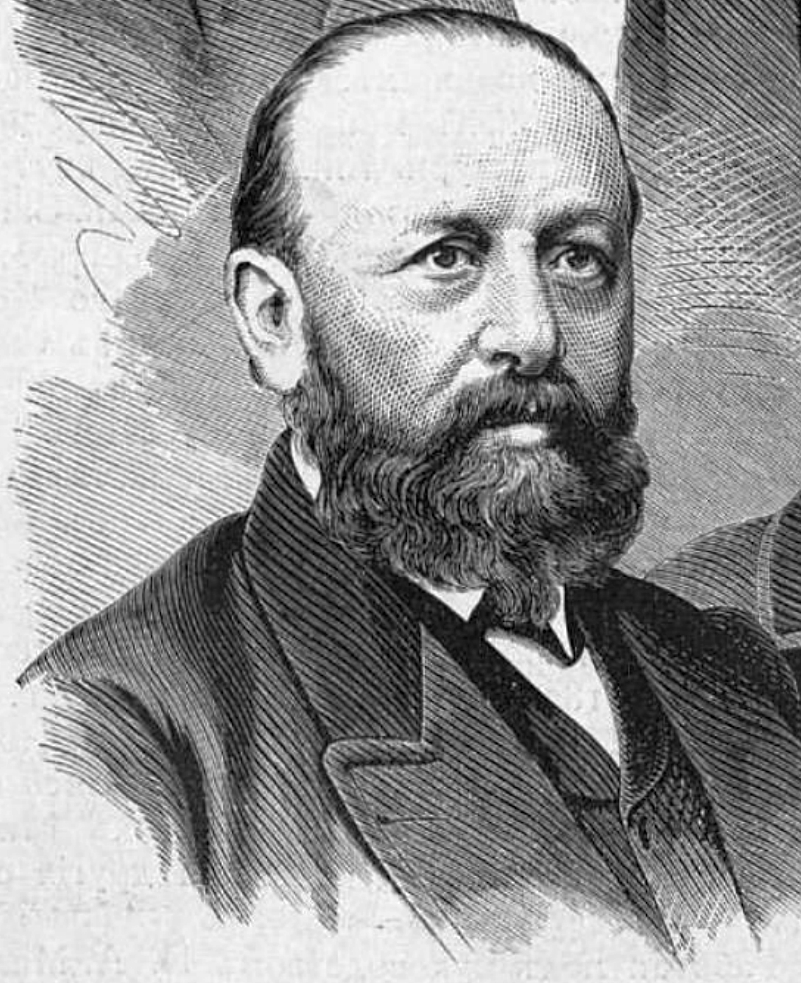
- Wirth
- Born: 27 January 1822; Breslau, Poland
- Died: 18 July 1900 (aged 78); Vienna, Austria
- Occupations: Journalist and economist

Max Wirth (Breslau, 27 January 1822 — Vienna, 18 July 1900) was a German journalist and economist.

== Life ==
Max Wirth is the son of Johann Georg August Wirth, a Bavarian writer and organizer of the Hambach Festival in 1832. Max studied law and political economy at the University of Heidelberg, where he joined the Corps Rhenania. Later he became a journalist in Frankfurt, where he founded the weekly magazine Der Arbeitgeber, a publication about the labour market, but also used to progress Wirth's personal views. He was part of various economic congresses and industrial associations. Between 1865 and 1873, he was director of the Swiss Statistical Bureau. Afterwards, he worked as a journalist again, first for the Neuen Freien Presse, later as Viennese correspondent for The Economist.

== Work ==
Max Wirth is mostly known his work Geschichte der Handelskrisen, a history of economic crises. The book went through four editions, the last editions appearing in 1890. He also wrote a book on the banking history of Germany and Austria-Hungary.

His name is cited disparagingly by Marx in Capital vol. I as 'Herr M. Wirth' to exemplify to the reader the 'run-of-the-mill vulgar economist and propagandist', being a name known to many German readers at the time.
