= Corps Rhenania Heidelberg =

German fraternity

Coordinates: 49°24′47″N 8°42′52″E

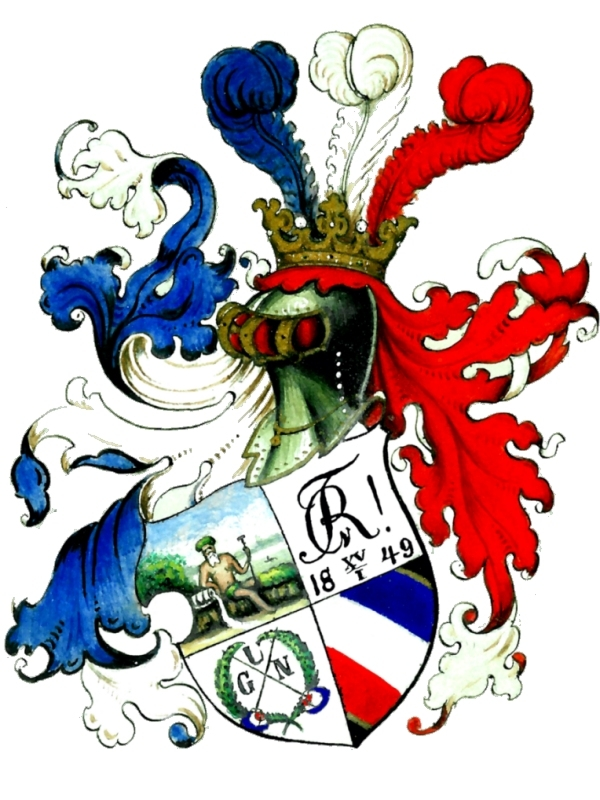
- Founded: 15 January 1849; 177 years ago Ruprecht Karls University Heidelberg
- Type: Studentenverbindung
- Affiliation: KSCV
- Status: Active
- Scope: Local
- Motto: Virtuti semper corona! Heraldic: Gladius ultor noster!
- Colors: Blue, Red, and White
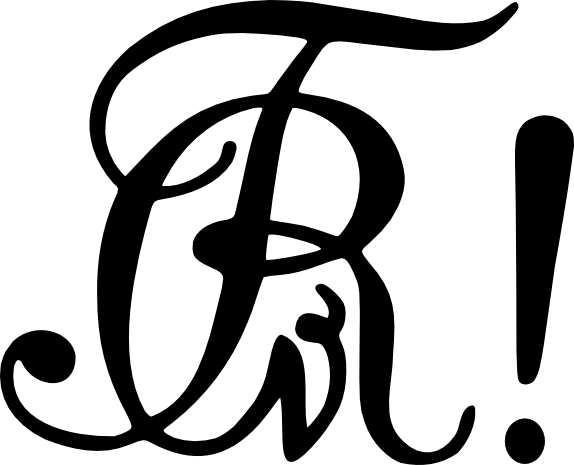
- Zirkel

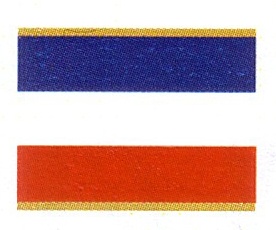
- Flag
- Chapters: 1
- Headquarters: Hauptstraße 231; Heidelberg 69117; Germany
- Website: www.rhenania-heidelberg.de

Corps Rhenania Heidelberg is a member Corps of the Kösener Senioren-Convents-Verband, the oldest association of student fraternities in Germany, Austria and Switzerland. Corps Rhenania is "pflichtschlagend", which refers to the fact that it requires of its members, that they participate in several ritual, organised duels with members of other specific student fraternities. Eligible applicants are those students, both current and former, of the Ruprecht Karl University in Heidelberg, Germany. Members of Corps Rhenania are colloquially referred to as "Rhenane".

== General ==
Rhenania Heidelberg is a student fraternity in Heidelberg. It was established in its current form on 15 January 1849, with predecessor organizations dating back to 1802. The name Rhenania refers to the Rhine region, the origin of most of its founding members, whose colors - blue, white, and red - were adopted by the fraternity.

Adhering to traditional Corps principles, Rhenania's membership includes international students from countries such as the United States, Spain, Japan, Sweden, Greece, and Turkey, while its alumni reside globally. Historically, a majority of its members have pursued studies in medicine, law, economics, chemistry, or theology, alongside various other professional fields including academia, politics, journalism, public service, and the military. A core principle of the fraternity is lifelong mutual support, designed to foster connections across generations.

== History ==
=== Rhenania I-III, Hassia, Nassovia ===
The oldest proof of foundation of Rhenania Heidelberg is dated 23 July 1802 (Rhenania I) by members of Rhenania Giessen (Hesse, Germany). Rhenania I was based on territorial filiations and aimed to counteract the freemasonry influenced student orders coming up within the second half of the 18th century. Around 1804, Rhenania I was undercut by members of the Heidelbergian Order of the Constantists (Heidelberger Constantisten-Orden). Rhenania and Franko-Badenia (founded in 1803) joined in 1803 to form the first Senior Convent (SC) and established the oldest bequeathed rules (SC-Comment). After the conflicts between students and the military in 1804 both Corps were significantly engaged in the walkout of the student body of Neuenheim. In December 1804 it came to tumultuous blow-ups between Heidelbergian Renonces and Constantists. Due to investigations of the academic authorities Rhenania I and Franko- Badenia dissolved themselves. On 19 May 1805 three members of Rhenania (Morgenstern, Wenz, Bayer) participated in the foundation of territorial filiated Palatia (I). The remainder of the old Rhenania founded the - in the beginning - closely linked territorial filiations of the Oberrheiner (Upper-Rhiners; Colors: red-blue-white-silver) and Niederrheiner (Lower- Rhiners; Colors: red-blue-white-gold) in August 1805. After the re-organization of the university by the elector and Grand Duke Karl Friedrich von Baden, numerous non-residential students immigrated to Heidelberg from 1805 onwards and founded new – but often short lived – fraternities (Suevia, Guestphalia, Curonia, Vandalia, Hannovera, Holsatia, Helvetia, Saxo-Borussia). The term Corps came up the first time after the partition of the Heidelbergian SC and was used for a group of territorial filiations, including the Niederrheiner (Lower-Rhiners), which later returned to the name Rhenania and dissolved themselves after the wars of liberation. 1818 the Corps Hassia I was founded which two years later renamed itself into Rhenania II. It was explicitly mentioned in the foundation journal that Rhenania II understands itself as the continuator of the Rhenania Corps of 1802. The phase of Rhenania II plunged into the politically heated-up time of the Vormärz. Many Badenese and Palatine liberals belonged to Rhenania II at this time, such as: Friedrich Wilhelm Knoebel (participant of the Hambach Festival), Friedrich Hecker (revolution leader in Baden) and Joseph Martin Reichard (President of the provisional government of Palatinate). Due to the assault on the Karzer and the walkout of the student body of Frankenthal (after disagreements with the Heidelberger Museumsgesellschaft (Museums Association) about the status of students on 14 August 1828), a declaration of disreputability valid for three years was decreed against the university but revoked again by the SC only a short time later. Rhenania II existed until 3 November 1833. As on behalf of Rhenania II the members of the 1829 founded Hassia II endowed Corps Rhenania III (until 1842). Due to external Corps students, notably members of Nassovia Göttingen the foundation of Corps Nassovia II resulted in 1838, which primarily recruited its procreation at the Gymnasium (High School) in Weilburg. Nassovia created close relations not only to Nassovia Göttingen but also to the other territorial filiated Corps Hasso-Nassovia in Marburg and Nassovia Würzburg. They also used to have an active exchange with the Corps Rhenania in Bonn.

=== Rhenania IV ===
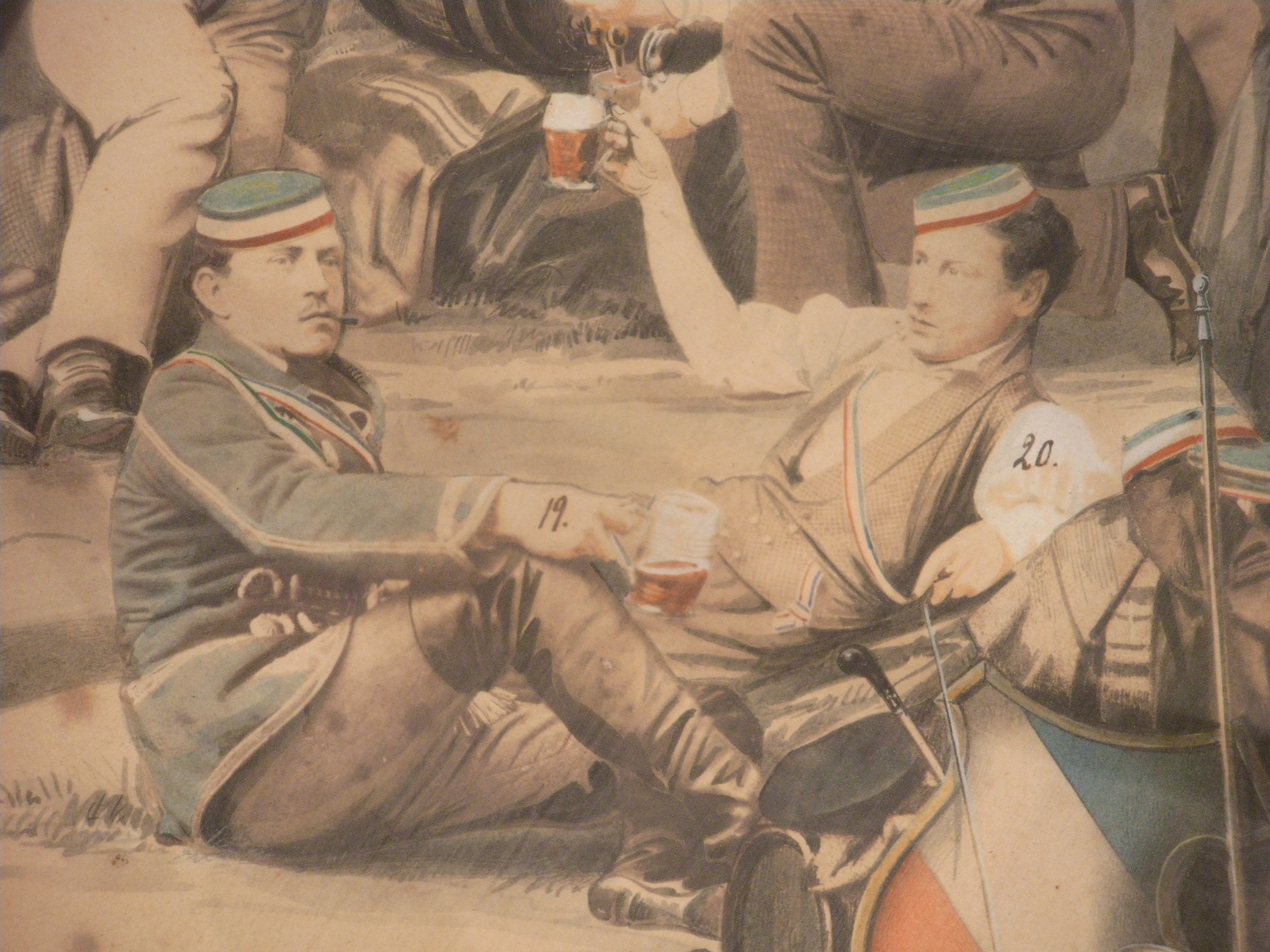
Ludwig Mond (right) as a member of the Corps Rhenania

The revolutionary year of 1849 also represents the endowment year for the – as of today existing – Corps Rhenania IV. In renunciation to sectionalism and a system of mini-states in Germany the members of Nassovia dissolved their Corps by 15 January 1849 and endowed on the same day a new Rhenania IV. Constitution, motto ("Virtuti semper corona!") and tradition were inherited from Nassovia. In the following years their recruitment area extended over the whole of Germany. Also students from European foreign countries (Switzerland, Greece, England, etc.) and from overseas (United States, Canada, South Africa, etc.) became active at Rhenania. Corps Rhenania is member of the Kösener Senioren-Convents-Verband (KSCV) since its endowment in 1848. The period during the German Empire can be accounted for the greatest time of prosperity for the Corps by far. Contrary to the SC-Corps Saxo-Borussia, Guestphalia and Vandalia, which were dominated by East-Elbian, Hanoveranian and Mecklenburgian capacious landowners and civil servants, Rhenania developed during this time frame to the Corps of the large scale industrials and the capital with the focal point of recruiting in the areas of Rhine-Ruhr, Frankfurt, Hamburg, and in the mid-German industrial zone. Rhenania therefore belonged to the Corps' which were perceived as extraordinary exclusive. The first printed Corps chronicles (semester reports) were sent out to the external members in 1875. The last living Alte Herren of Rhenania II acknowledged the existing Corps in 1882 as the legitimate successor of the old Rhenania of 1802/20. Living members of Rhenania II and Nassovia II were integrated in the Corps. The German novelist Theodor Fontane used the death of Rhenanian Emil Hartwich (1843- 1886; district judge in Düsseldorf) during a duel with Baron Léon Armand von Ardenne as guideline for his novel Effi Briest in 1894. The active Corps was suspended during 1914-1919 due to World War I. An effect of politicization of the student body during the early days of the Republic of Weimar was less significant among the Corps, as the SC of Heidelberg had chosen a self-imposed isolation and bulk headed off against the influence of the rest of the student body. Also the takeover of the National Socialists (Nazis) did not have any influence on the Corps operation in the beginning. On 8 September 1935 the termination of the association (KSCV) was inducted by the Head of the Reichskanzlei, Hans Heinrich Lammers by excluding the KSCV from the "Gemeinschaft studentischer Verbände" (Community of Collegiate Associations). After the finalization of termination of the KSCV also Corps Rhenania decided to suspend. Participation at the Heidelberger SC-Kameradschaft (SC-Comradeship of Heidelberg) "Axel Schaffeld" was retained and limited financial contribution; the participation was ceased by the end of World War II in 1945. Different from other university cities there were no personnel or organizational interfaces between comradeships' and Corps.

The celebration for the 100 year anniversary by the Alte Herren in 1949 took place within a frame appropriate to the circumstances of the post war time. Shapes of the previous Corps Rhenania in correlation with new approaches for contemporary collegiate cohabit were led by the Rheinländerkreis (Rhinland circle) which was sponsored by the "Verein Heidelberger Rhenanen" (Association of Heidelbergian Rhenanians) in the same year. On 3 May 1951 the decision was made to take over the "Rheinländerkreis" by the Alte Herren of Rhenania, leading to the reconstitution of Corps Rhenania. In the 1950s Rhenania was the initiator of establishing the "Heidelberger Interessengemeinschaft (HIG)" (Heidelbergian Community of Interest), a special purpose association for measure batting fraternities in Heidelberg. Due to a separate agreement between the SC and the university the breach of who with the HIG in 1958 was inevitable. Since then the SC has been going its own ways.

== Symbols ==
Corps Rhenania Heidelberg's motto is Virtuti semper corona!. Its heraldic motto is Gladius ultor noster!. Its colors are blue, red, and white.

== Corps mansions ==
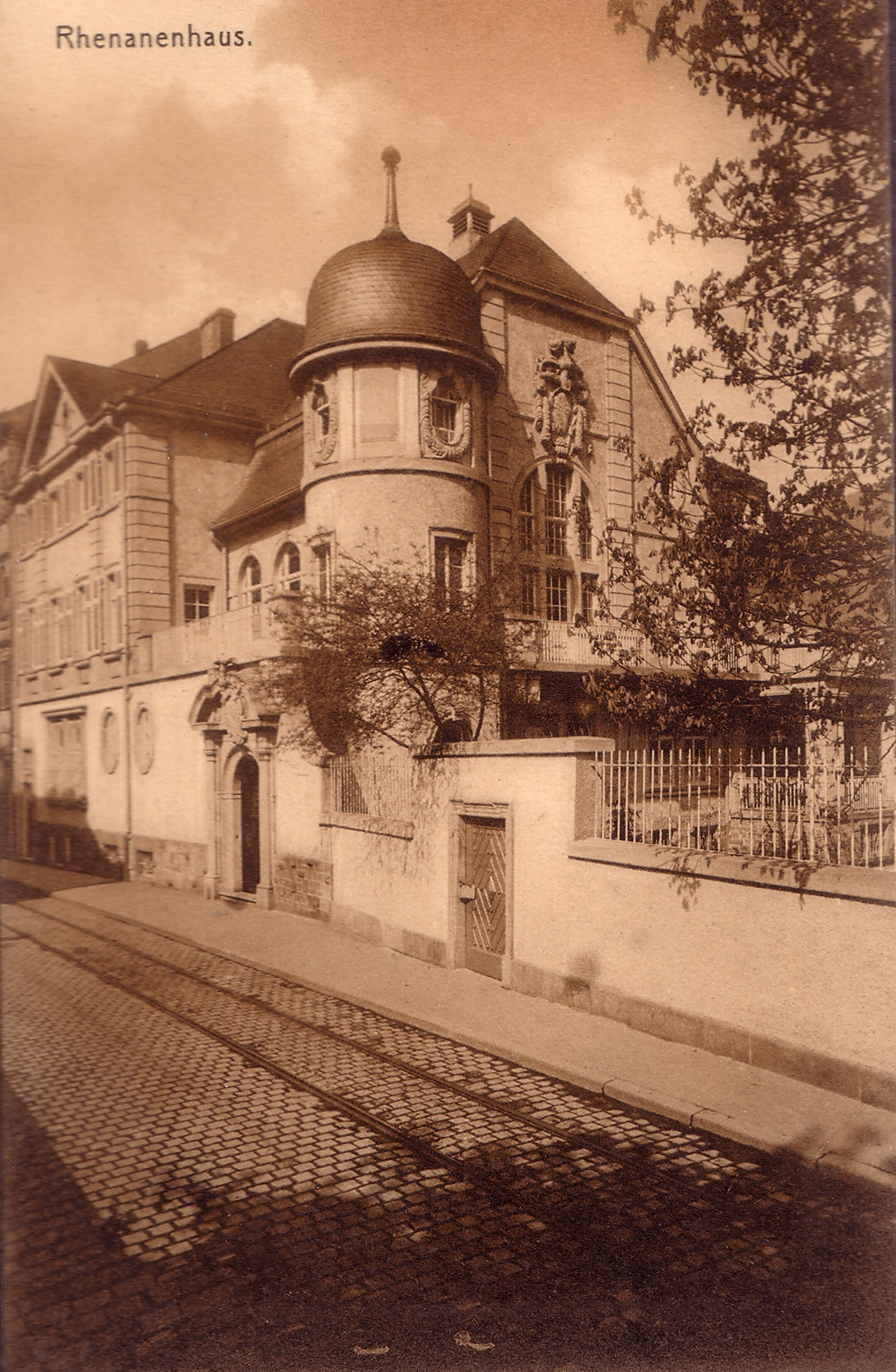
Mansion of Corps Rhenania in Heidelberg

After Corps Rhenania celebrated in alternating taverns throughout Heidelberg (e.g. "Seppl", lastly in "Weinberg" at Marktplatz), a baroque city house at Hauptstrasse 231 was acquired in 1882 as a Corps-house and the foundation of the "Rheinländischen Gesellschaft" as the subject of rights and duties. The house had previously been owned by the theologian Carl Daub and his son-in-law, Wilhelm Theophor Dittenberger. As the old house did not comply with altered representation necessities, it was torn down and today's Corps-house was erected in the years 1906-1909 according to the plans of the königlich-bayerischen Hofoberbaurats (Royal Bavarian Chief Government Building Officer), Eugen Drollinger. Simultaneously, the house at Neckarmünzgasse 14 behind the garden of the Corps-house was bought and turned into a dormitory.

== External relations ==
In the 1870s and 1880s Rhenania conducted an active policy of relationships and established contacts and socialized official connections to numerous Corps at other universities such as Bonn, Giessen, Marburg, Freiburg, Tübingen, Wurzburg, Munich, Jena, Halle, Breslau, Göttingen, Berlin, Strasburg and Zurich until the beginning of World War I. Since the Corps did not agree to a certain alignment within the KSCV, stagnation occurred as from 1900, and after World War I even turned into a downright isolation which was not to overcome just before a suspension. Today Corps Rhenania has friendly relations with the Corps Suevia Freiburg, Hasso-Nassovia Marburg, Nassovia Wurzburg and Tigurinia Zurich.

== Notable members ==
- Sir William Phipson Beale (1839–1922), Baronet Drumlamford, member of parliament (UK)
- Friedrich Landolin Karl von Blitterdorf (1792–1861), minister of foreign affairs, Grand Duchy of Baden
- Emil August Freiherr von Dungern (1802–1862), minister of state, Duchy of Nassau
- Emil Hartwich (1843–1886), judge and promoter of sports education, remembered for his tragic death in a duel
- Friedrich Hecker (1811–1881), lawyer, politician and revolutionary
- Carl Heinrich Georg von Heyden (1793–1866), senator and entomologist
- Alfred Kast (1856-1903), internist
- Ludwig Mond (1839–1909), chemist and business leader
- Joseph Martin Reichard (1803–1872), lawyer, politician and revolutionary
- Heinrich Schnee (1871–1949), Governor of German East Africa, member of the Lytton Commission
- Samuel Hanson Stone (1849–1909), Kentucky Auditor of Public Accounts
- Max Wirth (1822–1900), journalist and economist
