= Rudolf Lavant =

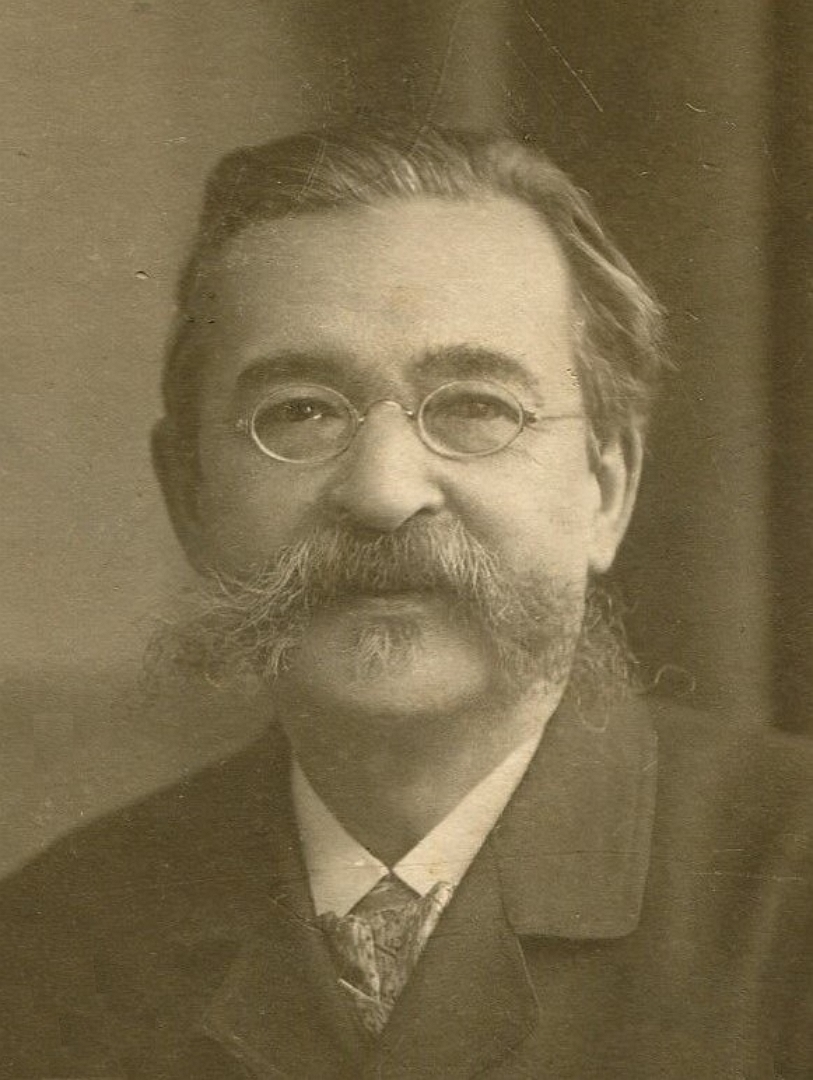
- Born: November 30, 1844; Leipzig, Kingdom of Saxony, German Confederation
- Died: December 6, 1915 (aged 71); Reudnitz, Kingdom of Saxony, German Empire
- Occupations: Writer, publisher, poet

Rudolf Lavant (born Richard Carl Cramer; 30 November 1844 – 6 December 1915) was a German writer and poet.

Lavant was the eldest of five children. His father Carl Eduard Cramer was close to the people's tribune Robert Blum. Johann Georg August Wirth, the organizer of the Hambach Festivals, was the great uncle of Rudolf Lavant.

== Life ==
After completing his General Certificate of Secondary Education studies at the City School of Leipzig, Lavant first became a commercial assistant in his hometown. In the war of 1866 he volunteered as an imperial hunter on the Austrian side. He then became an accountant, eventually a procurator, at the firm Dürbig & Co. of a garment business in Leipzig. He studied Gabelsberg's stenography and was the author of the journal "Neue Illustrirte Zeitung für Gabelsberger'sche Stenographen", the editor of this specialist journal was his friend Emil Trachbrodt. Lavant also devoted himself to the study of foreign languages (English, French, Italian), which he often needed for his travels abroad. Heinrich Wuttke, his father's friend, provided him with the rich treasures of his library, so Lavant came to the volumes of poems by his favorite poets Byron, Tennyson, Béranger, Victor Hugo, Herwegh and Freiligrath, the latter two being his role models in his work.

== Writer and publisher ==
In addition to his profession, Lavant led a second life as a writer and publicist for the proletariat. His lyrical work, begun in the late 1960s, gained a decisive anti-Prussian, socialist tendency since 1871, the year of the founding of the German Empire and the Paris Commune. The first poem to be found, "Friede!" ("Peace!") was published in the Volksstaat in 1871 and appeared on the cover of issue number 7 of the 21st edition from January, it is signed with Richard C. In the "History of German Social Democracy" Franz Mehring named him along with the best and most famous representatives of early socialist literature at the time, with Leopold Jacoby and Max Kegel. And Mehring called him the perfected of this group, a judgment, that was quite justified by Lavant.

Richard Cramer was admitted to the Faculty of Commerce in 1873. Dürbig & Co. the Civil rights of the city of Leipzig. His poems appeared in the Social democrats press (Die Neue Welt, Deutscher Jugendschatz and Der wahre Jacob) continuously under the pseudonym Lavant (the Green valley of the Lavant gave me my nom de plume) because the author did not want to endanger his private existence. In "Der wahre Jacob" 180 poems by Lavant were found, many unsigned poems could be assigned because they appeared in the In Reih und Glied collection, but there must be a further number of unsigned poetry. August Bebel assigned him the revision of the Forward printing house in 1876. During the period of the Sozialistengesetz of 1878–1890, when Lavant often published political "guides" in the illegal Sozialdemokrat and at the same time continued unrecognized in his commercial profession, his double life was at its peak. Der Sozialdemokrat was produced abroad, first in Zurich and later in London, and smuggled into Germany via the Rote Feldpost.

From 1884 to 1886 the anthology Vorwärts, a collection of poems for the working people, appeared in Zurich. Rudolf Lavant wrote the foreword and was the editor, it contained workers' poems by various authors. The book was originally published in six volumes, Volume 1-2/1884, Volume 3-6/1885, all of which were banned by the Socialist legislation. It was not until 1886 that the anthology appeared as a book edition in the Hottingen publications house. This poem also only made it to Germany on the "Rote Feldpost" railway.

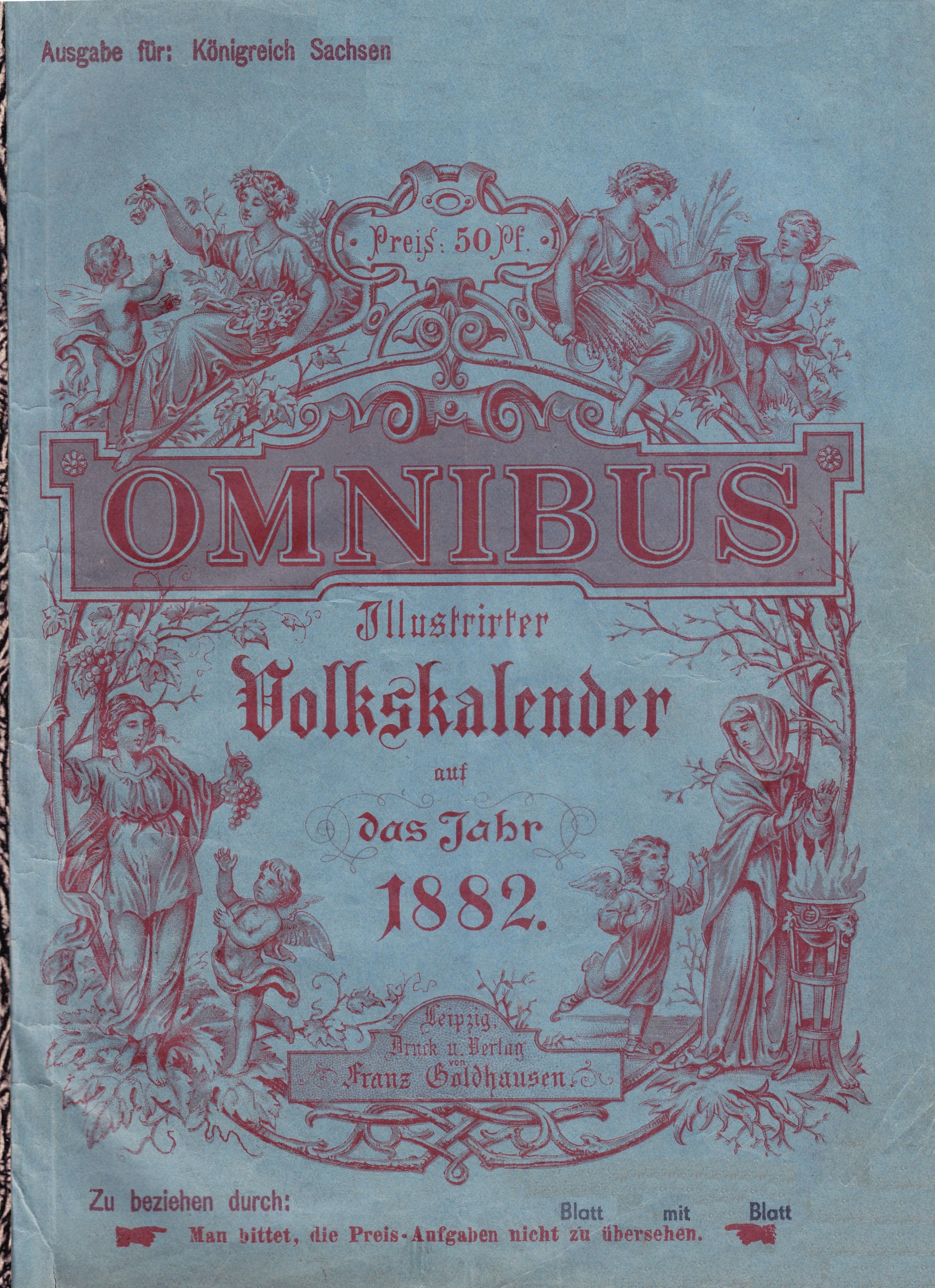
Omnibus Illustrated People's Calendar for the Year 1882

His work was also published in the Leipziger Volkszeitung, Das Lämplein, Die Fackel and the workers' calendars Omnibus and the Illustrirter Neue Welt Kalender. He also wrote poems for the Ameisen-Kalender. Lavant wrote political guides for various May and Festzeitungen der Sozialdemokratie of the Social Democratic Workers' Movement. In support of the textile workers of Crimmitschaus, who were on strike for the ten-hour day and higher wages from 7 August 1903 to 17 January 1904, Lavant wrote a poem. At the age of 27, Lavant began his productivity as a socialist writer, which extended to the end of his life.

Lavant wrote world-realistic agitatory verses, thought lyrics, ballad poems, but also humorous satirical verses in the Saxon language as "Fritzchen Mrweessesnich". As a poet, he introduced his talent to Leipzig's Volkszeitung from 1901 to 1914. Many of these poems (about 400) have been reprinted by foreign newspapers and have thus found a further spread, which was the joy of his satirical slaying of the small Saxon police spirit. At the beginning of World War I, many of his anti-war poems, which attempted to combat the all-out, terrible, anticultural genocide, were not published for censorship reasons. He also worked as a travel reporter, translator (Alphonse Daudet, Adrien Dézamy), editor and journalist.

Due to the dissolution of the company Dürbig & Co. on 31 December 1900, the company moved to England, Richard Cramer became unemployed, he worked for this company for almost 41 years. In 1901 he again found work as an independent, sworn book reviewer of the city of Leipzig, he practiced this activity until his death.

On 6 December 1915, Rudolf Lavant died in Leipzig. The funeral took place on 9 December 1915 at the Leipzig Südfriedhof.

== Works ==
- Ein verlorener Posten. In: Die Neue Welt. 3. Jahrgang, 1878 Nr. 14 ff. (autobiografischer Roman, als Fortsetzungsroman erschienen). Als Taschenbuch erschienen im Verlag: Amazon Kindle Direct Publishing 2019 ISBN 978-1-7036-9740-7.
- Idealisten. Novelle. In: Die Neue Welt. 5. Jahrgang, 1880, Nr. 33 ff. (als Fortsetzungsroman erschienen). Als Taschenbuch erschienen im Verlag: CreateSpace Independent Publishing Platform (27. Mai 2015) ISBN 978-1-5141-1340-0.
- Vorwärts. Eine Sammlung von Gedichten für das arbeitende Volk. Verlag der Volksbuchhandlung in Hottingen, Zürich 1886.
- Erinnerung an die Enthüllung des Gabelsberger-Denkmals in München am 10. August 1890 von Richard Cramer. Verlag von Friedrich Geissler Leipzig 1890.
- In Reih und Glied. Gedichte von einem Namenlosen. In: Deutsche Arbeiter-Dichtung. Band 3, Verlag J. H. W. Dietz, Stuttgart 1893. Als Taschenbuch erschienen im Verlag: CreateSpace Independent Publishing Platform (27. Mai 2015) ISBN 978-1-5141-1351-6.
- Eichenlaub und Fichtenreis. Liederschatz des Leipziger Turnvereins. Wilhelm Achilles, Leipzig 1901 (Gedichtsammlung).
