= Carl Cramer =

Carl Cramer may refer to:

- Earl Cramer (1896–1962), also known as Carl Cramer, American football player
- Carl Eduard Cramer (botanist) (1831–1901), Swiss botanist
- Carl Eduard Cramer (publicist) (1817–1886), German publicist
- Carl Gottlob Cramer (1758–1817), German writer of heroic romance
