= Johann Georg August Wirth =

German lawyer, writer, and politician

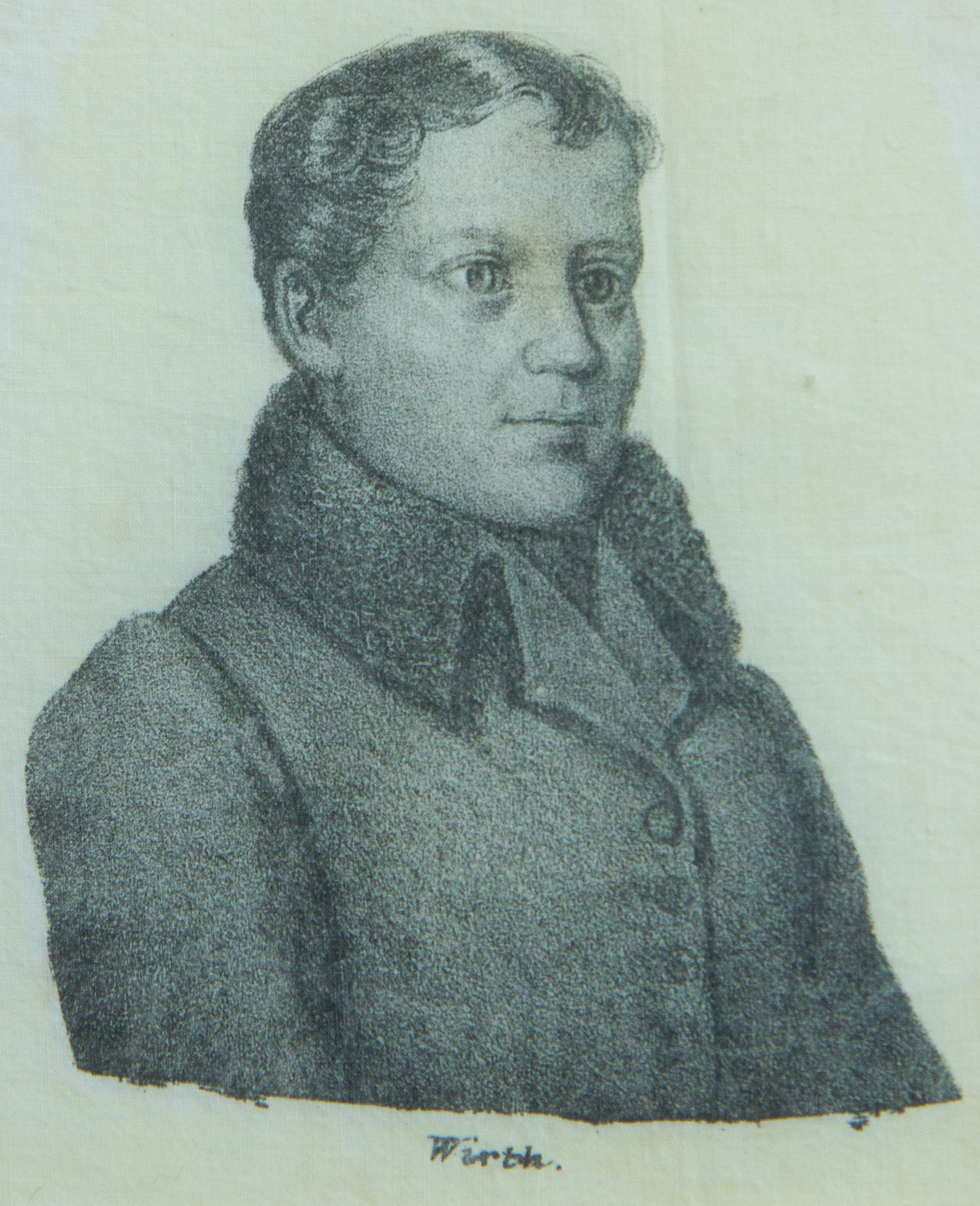
- Wirth
- Born: 20 November 1798; Hof, Bavaria, Holy Roman Empire
- Died: 26 July 1848 (age 49); Frankfurt
- Occupations: Lawyer, writer and politician
- Spouse: Regina Wirth
- Children: 1; Max Wirth

Johann Georg August Wirth (20 November 1798 – 26 July 1848) was a German lawyer, writer and politician during the Vormärz period that preceded the German revolutions of 1848–1849.

== Life ==
Born in Hof, Bavaria, Wirth was married to Regina Wirth. The marriage gave birth to the journalist Max Wirth and the co-founder of the Frankfurter Friedensverein Franz Ulpian Wirth. The writer Rudolf Lavant was a great-nephew of Wirth.

Wirth first attended his hometown's grammar school as a classmate of Karl Ludwig Sand and in 1811 moved to the Königliche Studienanstalt in Bayreuth. After graduating from high school, he studied law at the Friedrich-Alexander-Universität. In December 1817 Wirth was, together with other Corps-Renoncen, co-founder and committee member of the Erlanger Burschenschaft (Arminia). (Note: The Burschenschaft der Bubenreuther emerged from the Arminia in 1833.) Wirth left the fraternity at the beginning of January 1818, became senior of the Corps Franconia and remained a student of the Corps throughout his life. Then he practiced in Schwarzenbach an der Saale and from 1823 in the Bayreuth chancellery of Gottlieb Keim. He was denied a legal career because he could not pay the doctoral fees. At the beginning of 1831, he had the magazine Kosmopolit printed in Bayreuth at his own expense, in which he criticized the "setbacks of the Bavarian government" and demanded freedom of the press. In the same year he moved to Munich and took over the editorial office of the government-loyal magazine Das Inland by Johann Friedrich Cotta. Soon after he changed his political direction and founded the Deutsche Tribüne. It quickly became famous among the people and notorious among the princes, because Wirth used it, among other things, as a platform for the first fight for freedom of the press; so he called out to the ruling nobility: "The free press is the defence of the peoples against the tyranny of the rulers". He was increasingly harassed by persecutions, but took advantage of the gaps in censorship and always voted for the strengthening of civil rights. Then he went to the Circle of the Rhine. Political censorship also prevented his work there. In March 1832 his newspaper was banned by the then Federal Convention. Wirth became a member of the board of the 1832 founded Deutscher Preß- und Vaterlandsverein.

At the end of May 1832 Wirth organized the Hambacher Fest together with his comrade-in-arms Philipp Jakob Siebenpfeiffer. After a speech before many thousands of people, in which he called for the formation of a "Union of the Patriots" and beyond "the united Free States of Germany" had already let "the confederate republican Europe" live high, Wirth was remanded in custody and taken to Zweibrücken.

In prison he wrote a pamphlet with his political ideas entitled: Die politische Reform Deutschlands.. In June 1833 he was tried by a jury in the spectacular trial in Landau and was acquitted - Wirth had defended himself in an eight-hour speech and declared the princes high traitors. But in November 1833, the Zuchtpolizeigericht Zweibrücken sentenced him to the maximum sentence of two years in prison for insulting domestic and foreign authorities. He was imprisoned in Kaiserslautern. In the prison there he wrote the Fragmente zur Kulturgeschichte der Menschheit. After his release in December 1835 he was taken to Passau to serve a sentence there. However, he managed to escape. At the end of December 1836 he came to France and in 1839 to Kreuzlingen in Thurgau (Switzerland). There he edited the articles published by the Konstanz publisher Ignaz Vanotti (1798-1870) and the Geschichte der Deutschen. In 1847 he moved to Karlsruhe. In the Prussian principalities he was elected to the Frankfurt Parliament, but died shortly thereafter in Frankfurt on 26 July 1848 at age 49 and was buried in the Frankfurt Main Cemetery. Robert Blum gave the eulogy.

== Memorial ==
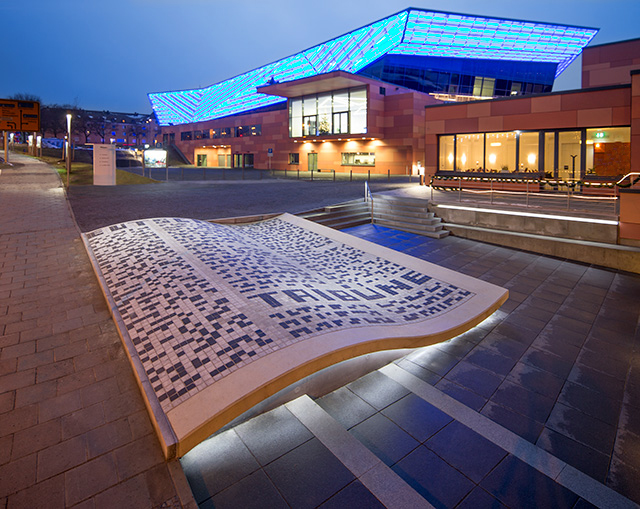
Sculpture Tribune II by the sculptor Andreas Theurer in honour of Wirth with a stylized side of the German Tribune in front of the Freiheitshalle in Hof.

The city of Hof erected a monument to the 150th anniversary of Wirth's death in 1998, which honours the person of Wirth by making his work as a fighter for freedom of the press its content. It was created by the sculptor Andreas Theurer and has the shape of a wave-shaped newspaper page lying on the ground. The surface consists of black and white cobblestones whose structure is reminiscent of a typeface. The pixel writing establishes a reference to the present and shows the title "Deutsche Tribüne" as a detail. The "D" of "Deutsch" is missing so that Wirth's struggle for German unity is not associated with dull nationalism. Before the inauguration, the then Federal President Roman Herzog remarked: "This will double the number of republican monuments in Germany".

In 2012, the monument was removed from its original location in the city centre and a second, smaller version was erected near the Freiheitshalle.

== Honours ==
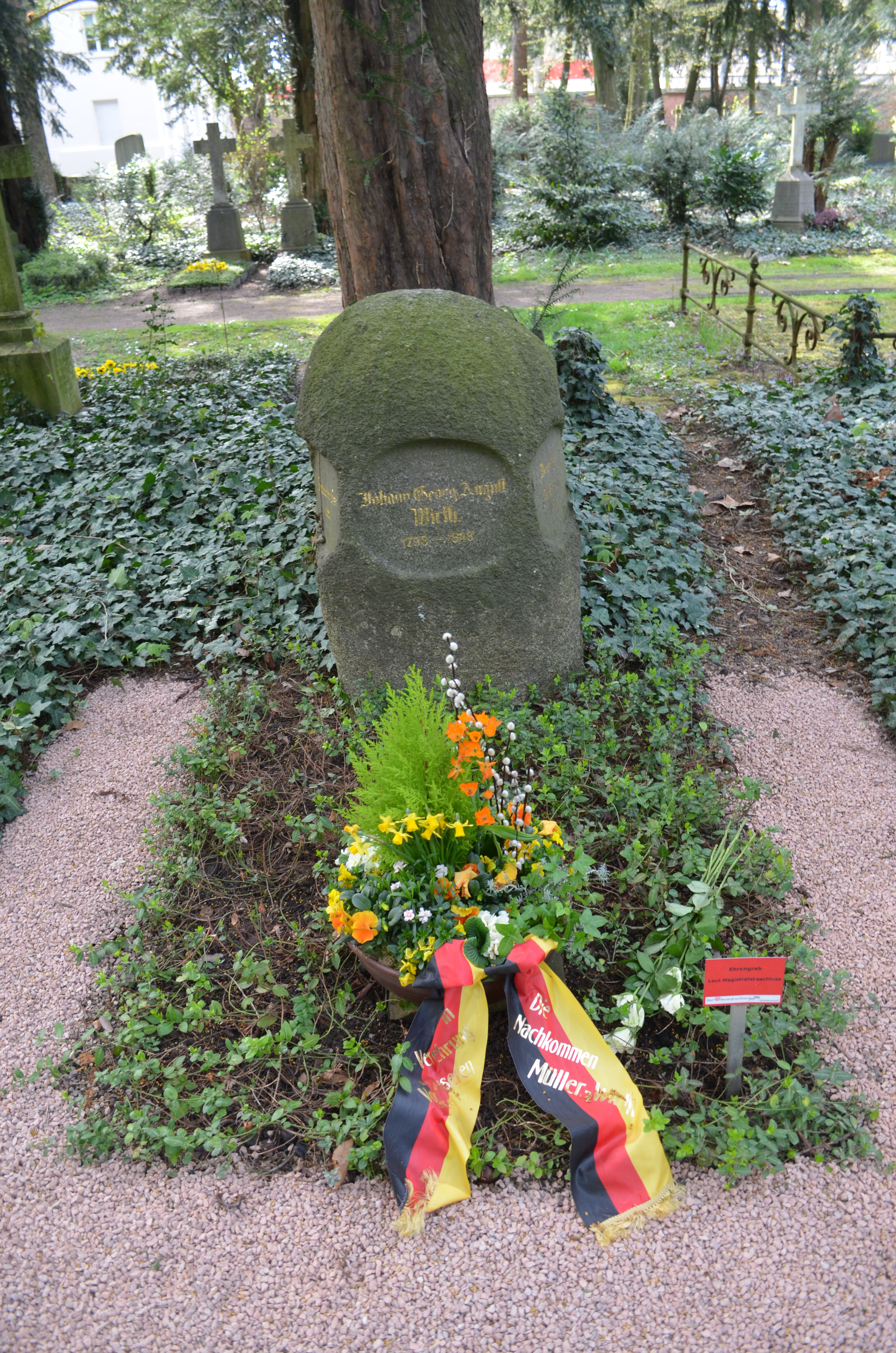
Johann Georg August Wirth's Ehrengrab at the Frankfurt Main Cemetery

The Akademie für neue Medien in Kulmbach, an institution for journalist training, has been awarding the Johann Georg August Wirth Prize since 2009. A Johann-Georg-August-Wirth-Realschule exists in Hof.

In 1998, the volume Die Rechte des deutschen Volkes. Eine Verteidigungsrede vor den assise zu Landau (1833) by Wirth was published in the series Bibliothek Europäischer Freiheitsbewegungen in the German Federal Archives.

== Work ==
- Entwurf eines Strafgesetzbuches. Ein Beytrag zur Erörterung der Frage: "ob der Entwurf des Strafgesetzbuches für Baiern vom J. 1822 dem zur Zeit möglichen Grade von Vollständigkeit u. Gerechtigkeit entspreche?“. Bayreuth 1825 Numerised
- Censurfreye Brochüren als Entschädigung für die Abonnenten des Inlandes. Erste Lieferung. München 1831 Numerised
- Johann Georg August Wirth (edit.): Deutsche Tribüne, 1831–1832. Reprint K. G. Saur, Munich 2007 ISBN 3-598-11543-1
  - Review: perlentaucher.de, in Perlentaucher, with redirection to Die Zeit
- Die politische Reform Deutschlands. Noch ein dringendes Wort an die deutschen Volksfreunde. Strasburg 1832 Digitalisat
- Das Nationalfest der Deutschen zu Hambach. 2 volumes. Christmann, Neustadt 1832. Das Nationalfest der Deutschen zu Hambach. Issue 1, issue 2)
- Das Recht des deutschen Volkes und die Beschlüsse des Frankfurter Bundestages vom 28. Juni 1832. o. O. and o. J. Numerised
- Fragmente zur Culturgeschichte. Erster Theil. J. J. Tascher, Kaiserslautern 1835 Numerised
- Fragmente zur Culturgeschichte. Zweiter Theil. J. J. Tascher, Kaiserslautern 1836 Numerised
- Die politisch-reformatorische Richtung der Deutschen im XVI. und XIX. Jahrhundert. Ein Beitrag zur Zeitgeschichte. Verlag der Deutschen Volkshalle, Belle-Vue 1841 Numerised
- Denkwürdigkeiten aus meinem Leben. Erstes Bändchen. Literarisches Institut, Emmishofen bei Konstanz 1844 Numerised
- Die Geschichte der deutschen Staaten. Von der Auflösung des Reiches bis auf unsere Tage. Vol. 1. Kunstverlag, Karlsruhe 1847 Numerised
- Die Geschichte der deutschen Staaten. 2 vol. 2. durchausverbesserte aufl. Hoffmannsche Verlags-Buchhandlung, Karlsruhe 1846 Numerised
- Die Geschichte der deutschen Staaten. 3 vol. 2. durchausverbesserte aufl. Hoffmannsche Verlags-Buchhandlung, Karlsruhe 1846 Numerised
- Die Geschichte der deutschen Staaten. 4 vol. 2. durchausverbesserte aufl. Hoffmannsche Verlags-Buchhandlung, Karlsruhe 1846 Numerised
- Ein Wort an die deutsche Nation. Kunstverlag, Karlsruhe 1848 Numerised
- J. G. A. Wirth’s Letztes Wort an die deutsche Nation. Mit Randglossen von M. Wirth. Sauerländer, Frankfurt am Main 1849 Numerised
