= Emil Hartwich =

German judge and promoter of sports education

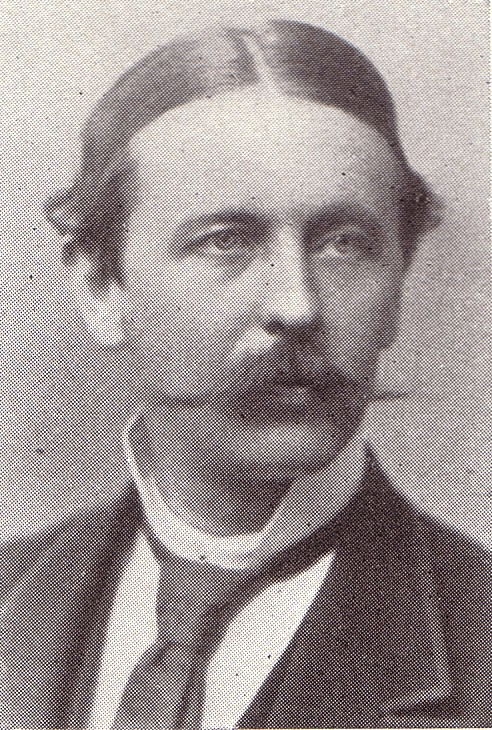
Emil Hartwich (date unknown)

Emil Ferdinand Hartwich (born 9 May 1843, Danzig, Kingdom of Prussia – 1 December 1886, Berlin) was a German judge and promoter of sports education, remembered for his death in a duel.

== Early life and career ==
Hartwich was the son of Emil Hermann Hartwich, the building surveyor and railway engineer of the Danziger government. Hartwich's early years were characterized by considerable moving about among different parts of Germany. Having attended elementary school in Danzig, in 1853, he was sent to the Humanistische Gymnasium in Berlin, and from 1856 to the Friedrich Wilhelm Gymnasium in Cologne.

In 1862 he took up study of jurisprudence at the University of Heidelberg, where he became a member of the ancient student fraternity, the Corps Rhenania. He completed his education at the University of Berlin and in 1868 entered the Prussian Judiciary. In 1870 he married Hero Jung (1845-1906), daughter of the liberal politician Georg Gottlob Jung and his wife Pauline Stein, and a first cousin of Mathilde Wesendonck. In 1874, he became an assistant judge (Hilfsrichter) in the District Court of Düsseldorf and in 1879 a Justice of the Peace (Amtsrichter).

In addition to his judicial work, Hartwich exerted himself in promoting the physical education of the young, published several writings on the subject and took part in founding the Association for Promotion of Personal Hygiene (Zentralvereins für Körperpflege in Volk und Schule).

== Affair with Elisabeth von Ardenne and death ==
In the summer of 1881 Hartwich, who was suffering from the throes of his unhappy marriage, became acquainted with young Elisabeth von Ardenne, who was ten years his junior. She had recently arrived in Düsseldorf together with her husband Armand Leon von Ardenne, due to Armand's ascent within the country’s political hierarchy. Emil Hartwich and Elisabeth von Ardenne soon turned out to have many things in common, such as their love for theatre plays. The correspondence between them did not even cease when Ardenne returned to Berlin on 1 October 1884, with Elisabeth and the couple’s two young children following him.

Hartwich continued to pay erratic visits to Elisabeth and her husband even after the couple’s departure. While he was sojourning in Berlin during the summer of 1886, he and Elisabeth both resolved to divorce their respective spouses and to marry each other. Ardenne, however, saw his secretly harboured suspicions confirmed when he located the hiding place of the letters which his wife and Hartwich had been exchanging over the course of several years.

Thereupon he filed for divorce and challenged his rival to a duel, an event upon which massive media coverage had been centred before it took place on 27 November 1886. Hartwich sustained severe injuries and died four days after the duel on 1 December 1886.

Although Armand von Ardenne was initially sentenced to two years’ imprisonment, his prison term was reduced to merely eighteen days not long afterwards.

The affair formed the historical background for the well-known novel "Effi Briest" by Theodor Fontane. Though Fontane changed the names and many of the concrete details, the affair was well-known enough for the background to be clear.

Elisabeth von Ardenne long survived her lover, living until 1952.

The Hartwichstrasse (Hartwich Street) in Düsseldorf-Oberkassel is named after Emil Hartwich.

== Writings ==
- Woran wir leiden. Freie Betrachtung und praktische Vorschläge über unsere moderne Geistes- und Körperpflege in Volk und Schule, " (What we suffer from - consideration and practical suggestions about modern care of the mind and personal hygiene in society and school "), Düsseldorf 1881 - 1882
- Reden über die vernachlässigte Ausbildung unserer Jugend, ("Speeches about the neglected education of our youth"), Düsseldorf 1884.

== Bibliography ==
- Horst Budjuhn: Fontane nannte sie „Effi Briest“. Das Leben der Elisabeth von Ardenne. Berlin 1985
- Manfred Franke: Leben und Roman der Elisabeth von Ardenne, Fontanes „Effi Briest“. Düsseldorf 1994
- Wilhelm Kettner: Emil F. Hartwich (1843–1886). Leben und Wirken des Düsseldorfer Amtsrichters als Sportpionier. In: Düsseldorfer Jahrbuch. Band 64, 1993, S. 163–169
- Franz Schellens: Emil Hartwichs Schriften für die körperliche Ertüchtigung der Jugend und für die Schulreform. Düsseldorf 1927
