= Fürsten zum Land Hinaus! =

German revolutionary song

Single by Johann Wilhelm Sauerwein
- Language: German
- English title: Princes Out of the Land!
- Published: 1832
- Genre: Folk

A recording of "Fürsten zum Land Hinaus!" with altered lyrics

"Fürsten zum Land Hinaus!" (English: Princes Out of the Land!) is the most prominent German revolutionary song from the Vormärz period of German history. It became famous for its blatant call for the overthrow of aristocracy across Germany's kingdoms.

== Origins ==
The exact origins of "Fürsten zum Land Hinaus!" are unknown, though it is thought to have been written in early 1832 by Johann Wilhelm Sauerwein. It was most likely inspired by the July Revolution in 1830 France. The earliest known reference to the song's existence was in the magazine Eulenspiegel in March 1832, describing it as "the satirical song starting with the words: Princes out of the Country!".The song was met with popular response at the 1832 Hambach Festival, where it eventually spread to the rest of Germany.

== Usage ==
The song became popular leading up to the German revolutions of 1848-49, part of the anti-monarchical and pro-republican revolutions of 1848. Following the failures of the German revolutions, the song was heavily cracked down on and disappeared from general view until the folk and Liedermacher revivals of the 1970s.

== Lyrics ==
The song initially featured 16 verses, one for each major region of Germany.

German	English
Fürsten zum Land hinaus! Jetzt kommt der Völkerschmaus raus, raus, raus, raus! Wilhelm liebt Bürgerwacht hebt ihn aus Preußen fort hebt ihn aus Preußen fort erschlagt den Hund! Der schönste Schwabenstreich ist Wilhelm aus dem Reich raus, raus, raus, raus! Bayernland ans Gewehr Ludewig taugt nichts mehr Ludewig taugt nichts mehr erschießt den Hund! Mecklenburg, deine Frist auch abgelaufen ist tick tack tick tack. Oldenburg, schleif' die Sens' Oldenburg, schleif' die Sens' zieh in die Residenz autsch, autsch, autsch, autsch! Hechingen und Sigmaringen müssen über die Klinge springen hoppsa, hoppsa! Reuß, Greiz, Schleiz Lobenstein, Reuß, Greiz, Schleiz Lobenstein jagt in ein Mausloch rein Katz', Katz', Katz', Katz'. Homburgs Landgräfelein wird das zu fürchten sein? Nein, nein, nein, nein! Metternich, marsch mit dir Metternich, marsch mit dir Rothschilds und Staatspapier marsch, marsch, marsch, marsch! Dem Deutschen Bundestag werft faule Eier nach kikeriki, kikeriki! Dann ist im Lande Raum pflanzet den Freiheitsbaum pflanzet den Freiheitsbaum hoch, hoch, hoch, hoch!	Princes out of the land! Now comes the people's feast! Out! Out! Out! Out Wilhelm loves citizen-murder! Throw him out of Prussia! Throw him out of Prussia! Beat the dog! The most beautiful Swabian prank! Is Wilhelm out of the Reich! Out! Out! Out! Out! Bavaria to arms! Ludwig, he is good for nothing! Ludwig, he is good for nothing! Shoot the dog! Mecklenburg's Friedrich Franz! Is also out of time! Tick tack tick tack! Oldenburg, sharpen your senses! Oldenburg, sharpen your senses! Move into the residence! Ouch, ouch, ouch, ouch! Hechingen and Sigmaringen! Have to jump over the blade! Oops, oops! Reuss, Greiz, Schleiz! Lobenstein, Reuss, Greiz, Schleiz! Lobenstein chases into a mouse hole! Cat, cat, cat, cat! Homburg's Landgräfelein! Will that be something to fear? No, no, no, no! Metternich, march with you! Metternich, march with you! Rothschilds and government securities! March, march, march, march! The German Bundestag! At them we'll throw rotten eggs! Cock-a-doodle-do, cock-a-doodle-do! Forests are room in the land! Plant the freedom tree! Plant the freedom tree! High, high, high, high!
