= Aethicus Ister =

Protagonist of a medieval travel account

Start of the Cosmographia in the late 8th- or 9th-century manuscript from southwestern Germany

Aethicus Ister (Aethicus Donares, Aethicus of Istria or Aethicus Ister) was the protagonist of the 7th/8th-century Cosmographia, purportedly written by a man of church Hieronymus (Jerome, but not the Church Father Jerome), who purportedly censors an even older work for producing the book as its censored version. It is a forgery from the Middle Ages.

It describes the travels of Aethicus around the world, and includes descriptions of foreign peoples in usually less than favourable terms. It displays a flat Earth cosmology, maybe for making sport of it. There are also numerous passages which deal directly with the legends of Alexander the Great. Heinz Löwe (1913–1991) found a striking correspondence between the letters of Aethicus and the Old Turkic script. He considers Aethicus to be of late Avar ethnicity from the Carpathian basin. Aethicus is believed by Franz Brunhölzl to have been a Scythian that lived in the region of present-day Dobrogea, Romania.

== Sources ==
In terms of sources, the Bible and Isidore of Seville (d. 636) form the lion's share of Pseudo-Jerome's allusions. It was once argued that Jerome's work had provided source material for Isidore, but this was disproven by Dalche (1984). These sources, and the others, are presented in a very paraphrased form and are rarely made reference to directly. The work is also filled with many fictional sources, which makes Jerome similar to Virgilius Maro Grammaticus, an Irish pseudo-grammarian of the 7th century. Whether there is any relationship between the two has been considered by Herren (1994), but the evidence is not conclusive in proving a certain, direct connexion between the authors.

The title Aethici Cosmographia was first incorrectly given a work published in 1575 by Josias Simmler and later by Grovonis in 1696. The text has some identical geographic observations but the framing is completely different, in this case more of names in lists. It has been supposed that the writer is Julius Honores (even later called Pseudo-Aethicus) mentioned by Cassiodorus in Institutiones divinarum et saecularium litterarum (25) as Julius Honorius Crator.

== Criticisms ==
The Latin of the work is sometimes vulgar and facile, other times cryptic and opaque, owing in part to Jerome's extremely difficult vocabulary of Graecisms and Latin/Greek compounds. (See Herren, 2001). Anagram games, and etymological 'jokes' (e.g. using the verb 'monstrare' followed by the noun 'monstrum', then the verb 'demonstrare') and other ludic elements are found throughout. The Latin spelling of the work seems to suggest also that the author was a Merovingian Frank (Prinz, 1993), but the idea of "Merovingian" spellings has recently been attacked as an unreliable measure of origin. Furthermore, only one manuscript of the work appears to have been written in Tours, while the majority can be traced to centres in what is now Germany (Prinz, 1993).

Jerome may have been associated with the Frankish translator of Pseudo-Methodius (Petrus Monachus). There are several passages which seem to be borrowed one way or another, suggesting perhaps a parallel relationship rather than one of dependence. Nevertheless, Jerome's knowledge of Greek (a rare feat in Western Europe at the time) may indicate an association with the Canterbury school of Archbishop Theodore in the late 7th century. See a recent article by Michael Herren (in Nova de Veteribus) on a possible Anglo-Saxon connection for Jerome. What seems clear is that Jerome was not limited to a single locale throughout his working lifetime.

== Bibliography ==
=== Editions ===
- The Cosmography of Aethicus Ister: Text, Translation, and Commentary, ed. Michael W. Herren, Publications of the Journal of Medieval Latin 8 (Turnhout: Brepols, 2011).
- Die Kosmographie des Aethicus, ed. O. Prinz, MGH (Munich: 1993).
- Aethici Istrici Cosmographia ab Hieronymo ex Graeco Latinum breviarium redacta, ed. H. Wuttke (Leipzig: 1854).
- Éthicus et les ouvrages cosmographiques intitulés de ce nom, ed. A. d'Averzac (Paris: 1852).
- (Partial) Aethici Istri Cosmographi Origo Francorum, ed. B. Krusch, in MGH SS rer. Merv. VII (Hanover: 1919).

=== Studies ===
- J.G. Dalché, "Du nouveau sur Aethicus Ister? A propos d'une théorie récente", Journal des savants, 3-4 (1984), pp. 175–186.
- G. Hays, "'Important if True': Lucan's Orpheus and Aethicus Ister', in Notes and Queries, (2010) [contra the interpretation by R. Pollard "'Lucan' and 'Aethicus Ister'", Notes and Queries, 53 (2006), pp. 7-10].
- M. Herren, "Aethicus Ister and Virgil the Grammarian", in Mélanges François Kerlouégan (Paris: 1994), pp. 285–288.
- M. Herren, "The ‘Greek Element’ in the Cosmography of Aethicus Ister", Journal of Medieval Latin, 11 (2001), pp. 184–200.
- M. Herren, "The ‘Cosmography’ of Aethicus Ister: Speculations about its date, provenance, and audience", in Nova de Veteribus, eds. A. Bihrer and E. Stein (Munich: 2004), pp. 79–102.
- K. Hillkowitz, Zur Kosmographie des Aethicus, I (Bonn: 1934); II (Frankfurt: 1973).
- H. Löwe, Ein literarischer Widersacher des Bonifatius. Virgil von Salzburg und die Kosmographie des Aethicus Ister (Wiesbaden: 1952).
- I. Wood, "Aethicus Ister: An exercise in difference", in Grenze und Differenz im frühen Mittelalter, eds. W. Pohl und H. Reimitz (Vienna: 2000), pp. 197–208.
