= Friedrich von Bernhardi =

Prussian general and military historian (1849–1930)

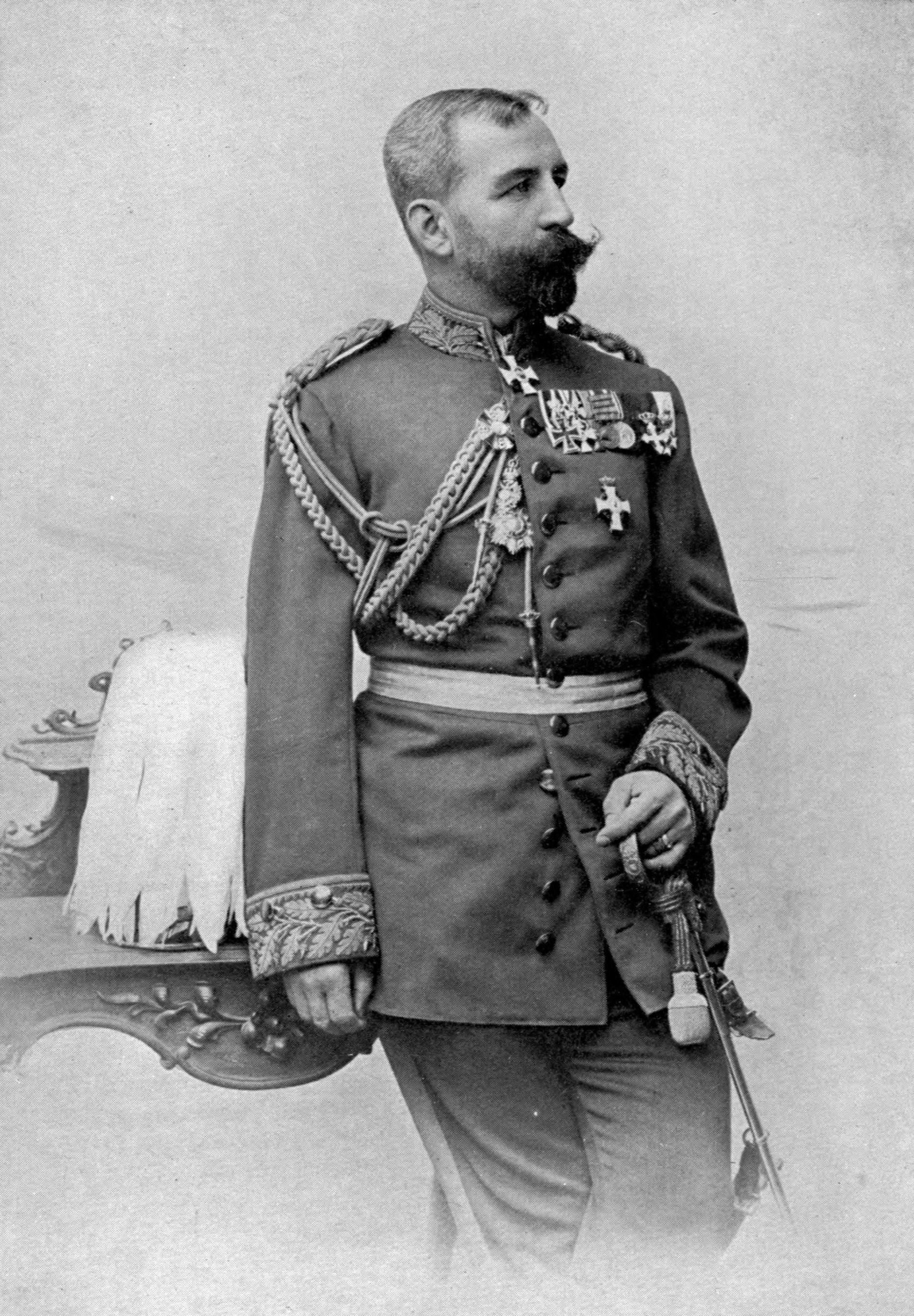
- Bernhardi, c. 1910
- Born: Friedrich Adam Julius von Bernhardi; 22 November 1849; St. Petersburg, Russian Empire
- Died: 11 July 1930 (aged 80); Hirschberg-Kunnersdorf, Lower Silesia, Prussia, Germany
- Military career
- Allegiance: Prussia; Weimar Republic
- Branch: Prussian Army
- Rank: General
- Conflicts: Franco-Prussian War; World War I
- Awards: Pour le Mérite

Friedrich Adam Julius von Bernhardi (22 November 1849 – 11 July 1930) was a Prussian general and military historian. He was a best-selling author prior to World War I. A militarist, he is perhaps best known for his bellicose book Deutschland und der Nächste Krieg (Germany and the Next War), printed in 1911. Describing war as a "divine business", he proposed that Germany should pursue an aggressive stance and ignore treaties.

== Biography ==
Bernhardi was born in St. Petersburg, Russian Empire. His family emigrated to Schöpstal, Silesia in 1851.

During the Franco-Prussian War (1870–71), Bernhardi was a cavalry lieutenant in the 14th Hussars of the Prussian Army, and at the end of that conflict had the honor of being the first German to ride through the Arc de Triomphe when the Germans entered Paris.

From 1891 to 1894, he was German military attaché at Bern and was subsequently head of the military history department of the Grand General Staff in Berlin. He was appointed general in command of the VII Army Corps at Münster in Westphalia in 1907, but retired two years later and busied himself as a military writer. Widespread attention was excited by the memoirs of his father, the diplomat and historian Felix Theodore von Bernhardi, which he published, and still more by his book Germany and the Next War. In Germany and the Next War, Bernhardi stated that war "is a biological necessity," and that it was in accordance with "the natural law, upon which all the laws of Nature rest, the law of the struggle for existence."

Bernhardi served during World War I as a general. He fought with success first in the Eastern Front on the Stochod river, where he stormed the bridgehead of Zarecze on Stochod river, and afterwards on the Western Front, in particular at Armentières. He was awarded the Pour le Mérite on 20 August 1916, for his participation in the German defense against the Brusilov Offensive.

== Partial bibliography ==
- Videant Consules: Ne Quid Respublica Detrimenti Capiat (1890) (Let the consuls see to it that no harm comes to the republic) (published anonymously)
- Unsere Kavallerie im Nächsten Kriege. (1899) (Cavalry in Future Wars)
- Deutschland und der Nächste Krieg. (1911) (Germany and the Next War)
- Vom heutigen Kriege. (1912) (On War of Today)
- Vom Kriege der Zukunft, nach den Erfahrungen des Weltkrieges. (1920) (On War of the Future, in light of the lessons of the World War)

== Awards and decorations ==
- Order of the Red Eagle, First Class with oak leaves
- Order of the Crown, First Class (Prussia)
- Iron Cross of 1870, 2nd class
- Service Cross (Prussia)
- Commander Second Class of the Order of the Zähringer Lion (Baden)
- Grand Cross of the Albert Order (Saxony)
- Lippe House Order, 1st class
- Gold Cross of the Order of the Redeemer (Greece)
- Officer's Cross of the Order of Saints Maurice and Lazarus (Savoy)
- Commander of the Order of Franz Joseph (Austria-Hungary)
- Grand Officer of the Order of the Crown (Romania)
- Grand Cross of Military Merit (Spain)
- Order of the Medjidie, 3rd class (Ottoman Empire)
- Iron Cross of 1914, 1st Class
- Pour le Mérite with oak leaves
  - Pour le Mérite on 20 August 1916
  - Oak Leaves on 15 May 1918
