= Deutschtum =

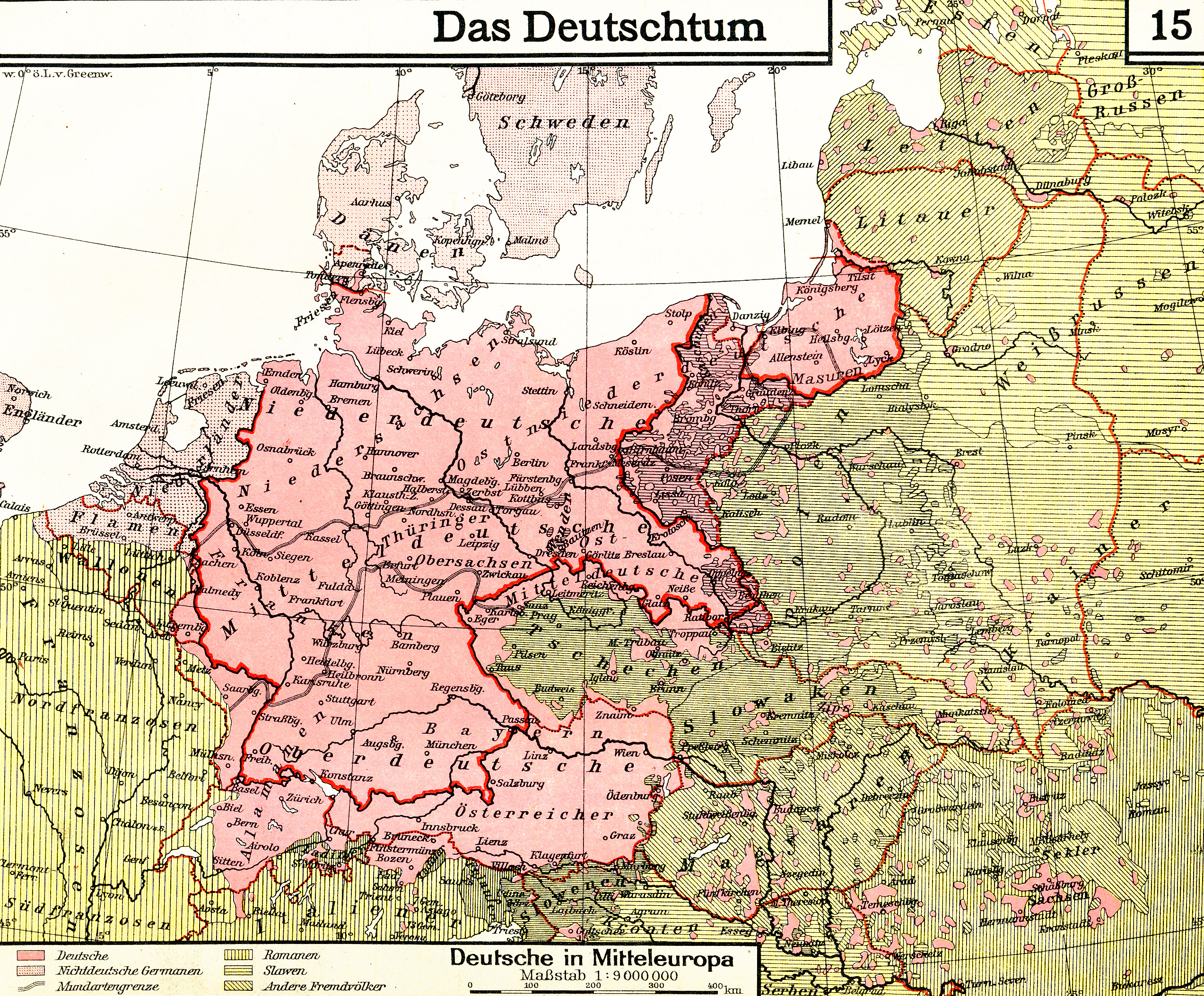
Map depicting the territories inhabited by ethnic Germans in Europe during the interwar period (c. 1930)

Deutschtum (German pronunciation: [ˈdɔʏtʃtuːm]) is a German term equating to "Germanness". It may either refer to the German character and spirit, the belonging and yearning to the German people or the entirety of German ethnic groups residing in foreign countries. An anti-Western concept of a romanticized Deutschtum has been an important component of German nationalism, when the conceptions of Volk (people) and Gemeinschaft (community) were driven to their extremes during the Third Reich.

== See also ==
- Volksgemeinschaft
- Britishness
- Romanitas
- Russian world
- Hindutva

== Bibliography ==
- Verheyen, Dirk (1999). The German question: A Cultural, Historical, and Geopolitical Exploration. Cambridge, England, UK; Malden, Massachusetts, USA: Westview Press. ISBN 0-8133-6878-2.
