= Heinrich Wuttke =

German historian (1818–1876)

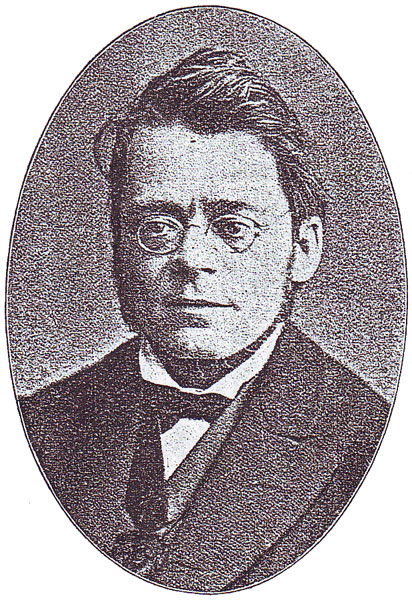
Heinrich Wuttke (1818-1876)

Johann Karl Heinrich Wuttke (12 February 1818 – 14 June 1876, Leipzig) was a German historian and politician.

== Life ==
He was born in Brieg in the Prussian Province of Silesia (present-day Brzeg, Poland), where his father was a mayor. From 1829 he attended the Gymnasium in Breslau and. Having obtained his Abitur degree in 1836, he went on to study history, philosophy and philology at the city's university, where he befriended professor Hoffmann von Fallersleben. He did his doctorate in 1839 with a dissertation on Thucydides. In 1841 he became lecturer Privatdozent of history at the University of Leipzig, having received his habilitation from Wilhelm Wachsmuth, again with a treatise on Thucydides. In 1848 he succeeded Friedrich Christian August Hasse as full professor at the auxiliary sciences of history department in Leipzig.

Wuttke maintained good relations with the Saxon education minister Karl Ludwig von der Pfordten. From May 1848, he was a member of the revolutionary Frankfurt Parliament. A close ally of the progressive politician Robert Blum, he joined the left-wing Württemberger Hof faction. In parliament, he advocated a "Greater German" solution and refused to offer King Frederick William IV of Prussia the German Imperial crown. Later he approached the policies of Ferdinand Lassalle.

Wuttke's "Greater German" conception also led to conflicts with academics promoting a Prussian-led unification of Germany, such as Georg Voigt, Anton Heinrich Springer, and especially young Heinrich von Treitschke, who diligently attended his lectures but developed a deep loathing against him. Even at Leipzig University, Wuttke tried to implement several academic reforms which later were also backed by the Saxon court. After the death of cultural historian Gustav Klemm in 1867 he demanded the acquisition of his comprehensive collections which created the basis for the Leipzig Museum of Ethnography. He held his post at Leipzig University until his death in 1876, when the chair was renamed Auxiliary sciences of Medieval and Modern History led by Carl von Noorden.

== Work ==
Among his numerous published works was a History of Scripture, covering a wide range of non-alphabetical writing from tattoo, cuneiform and hieroglyphs to Japanese and Chinese characters, as well as an 1854 edition of Aethicus Ister titled Aethici Istrici Cosmographia ab Hieronymo ex Graeco Latinum breviarium redacta. Other significant works by Wuttke include:

- König Friedrich's des Großen Besitzergreifung von Schlesien und die Entwicklung der öffentlichen Verhältnisse in diesem Lande bis zum Jahre 1740, 1841-1843 (two volumes). – Frederick the Great's seizure of Silesia, etc.
- Polen und Deutsche Politische betrachtungen, 1846 – Poland and German political considerations.
- Ueber Erdkunde und Karten des Mittelalters, 1853 – On geography and maps of the Middle Ages.
- Die Völkerschlacht bei Leipzig, 1863 – The Battle of Leipzig.
- Städtebuch des Landes Posen. Codex diplomaticus: Allgemeine Geschichte der Städte im Lande Posen. Geschichtliche Nachrichten von 149 einzelnen Städten. Leipzig 1864 (E-Copy) – Historical descriptions of 149 towns of the land of Posen (former German Provinz Posen).
- Zur Geschichte der Erdkunde im letzten Drittel des Mittelalters : die Karten der Seefahrenden Völker Südeuropas bis zum ersten Druck der Erdbeschreibung des Ptolemäus, 1871 – On the history of geography in the last third of the Middle Ages, etc.
- Die deutschen Zeitschriften und die Entstehung der öffentlichen Meinung. Ein Beitrag zur Geschichte des Zeitungswesens, 1875 – German magazines and the formation of public opinion. A contribution to the history of the newspaper business.
