= Hambach Festival =

1832 German national democratic festival

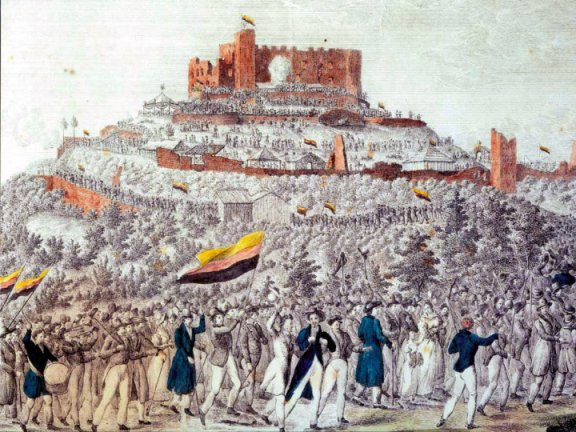
Procession to Hambach Castle, lithograph about 1832. The flag used by the procession would later become the German flag but with the colours in a different order.

The Hambacher Festival was a German national democratic festival celebrated from 27 May to 30 May 1832 at Hambach Castle, near Neustadt an der Weinstraße, in present-day Rhineland-Palatinate, Germany. The event was disguised as a nonpolitical county fair. It was one of the main public demonstrations in support of German unity, freedom and democracy during the Vormärz era.

== Background ==
At the time of the 1815 Congress of Vienna, Hambach Castle with the historic Palatinate region on the west bank of the Rhine was part of the Kingdom of Bavaria. It had however been occupied by French Revolutionary troops during the War of the First Coalition in 1794 and incorporated into the French First Republic in 1801. After Napoleon's defeat, the new Bavarian authorities maintained some constitutional rights, but the local population nevertheless suffered from high taxes and increasing censorship.

National and liberal ideas were strongly advocated by student fraternities (Burschenschaften), the first of which, the Urburschenschaft, was founded in Jena, Thuringia in 1815 and had adopted the Black-Red-Gold colours of the Lützow Free Corps forces, who had fought against the Napoleonic troops. A corresponding flag was already carried along the procession to the Wartburg Festival in 1817. Suppressed by the 1819 Carlsbad Decrees, the German democratic movement gained new momentum by the French July Revolution of 1830 as well as by the November Uprising in Russian Congress Poland, sparking unrests in Saxony, Hanover, Hesse, Brunswick and even in the Prussian capital Berlin. The insurgents witnessed the implementation of the French constitutional July Monarchy and the Belgian Revolution, but also the suppression of the Polish National Government of Prince Adam Jerzy Czartoryski by Russian troops. About 10,000 emigrants fled Poland in the so-called Great Emigration to France via the German states; they were well received especially in Saxony, Baden and Bavaria, where several pro-Polish patronage associations (Polenvereine) arose.

== Festival ==
The formerly French Palatinate had been a last resort for liberal authors and intellectuals, who now had to face the reactionary Bavarian policies. In January 1832 a number of journalists established a democratic association for freedom of the press and speech, which was almost immediately banned by the state government. In turn, the initiators called for a "fair" at Hambach Castle, as any demonstrations were prohibited.

About 20,000-30,000 people came, from all ranks of society—workmen, women, students and members of parliament, as well as from France and Poland. A delegation of 17 to 20 Polish emigrants took part in the procession from the Neustadt market place uphill to the castle ruin. This pro-Polish support expressed in Hambach was the climax of German liberals' enthusiasm for Poland. Gustave Koerner, who was present, described in his memoirs one highlight of the festival in this manner:

From various platforms eloquent speeches were made by Doctor Siebenpfeiffer, Wirth, Scharpff, Henry Brueggemann, and others, representing the sad condition of Germany, its insignificance in the council of European nations, its depression in trade and commerce, all owing to the want of national union, the division into thirty-eight States, large and small, with their different laws, different weights and measures, different currencies, and most of all to the custom-house lines surrounding every State. The orators complained of the pressure which Austria and Prussia exercised over the German Diet at Frankfort, compelling even liberal-minded princes to the adoption of unconstitutional and illegal measures. Brueggemann, whose speech was one of the most eloquent, addressed the meeting as the representative of the German youth, which, in spite of criminal persecutions, he asserted had kept the idea of the liberty and unity of the Vaterland alive. Persecuted by the government, ridiculed by the indifferent and by the organs of the government, the Burschenschaft had ever represented the union of all the German races, had obliterated State lines, and had persistently propagated the necessity of a national union throughout the land by its members. It was an exciting moment, when, at the close of his speech, he called upon the assembly to hold their hands up and to swear the oath which the delegates of the three Swiss cantons, on the height of the Ruetli, swore, as given in the glorious language of Schiller in his "Tell".

"We swear to be a nation of true brothers,
Never to part in danger and in death."
"Wir wollen sein ein einzig Volk von Bruedern,
In keiner Noth uns trennen und Gefahr."
"We swear we will be free as were our sires
And sooner die than live in slavery."
"Wir wollen frei sein wie die Vaeter waren,
Eher den Tod, als in der Knechtechaft leben."

Thousands held up their hands, and in the most solemn manner repeated the sentences as given by Brueggemann. After a deep silence tremendous cheers arose, and Brueggemann was taken down in triumph by an electrified multitude.

— Gustave Koerner, Memoirs of Gustave Koerner, Permission: Northern Illinois University

The main demands of the meeting were liberty, civil and political rights as well as national unity and popular sovereignty against the European system of the Holy Alliance. No consensus was reached in regard to actions, and a few uncoordinated violent acts were carried out by students later. The poet Ludwig Börne, who followed his invitation by the representatives of the banned press association, described his mixed emotions, when Heidelberg students gathered in a clamorous torchlight procession in his honour, declaring him a national hero. Burschenschaft members demanded an open revolt and the implementation of a provisional government, which was strongly rejected by the journalists. Nevertheless, of the four main organizers of the meeting, three (Philipp Jakob Siebenpfeiffer and the attorneys Schüler and Geib) fled the country, a fourth (Johann G. A. Wirth) chose to stay and was sentenced to two years in prison.

The German revolutionary song "Fürsten zum Land Hinaus!" originated at the festival, to popular enjoyment. The song quickly spread throughout Germany, eventually becoming the unofficial anthem of the 1848 German revolution.

== Aftermath ==
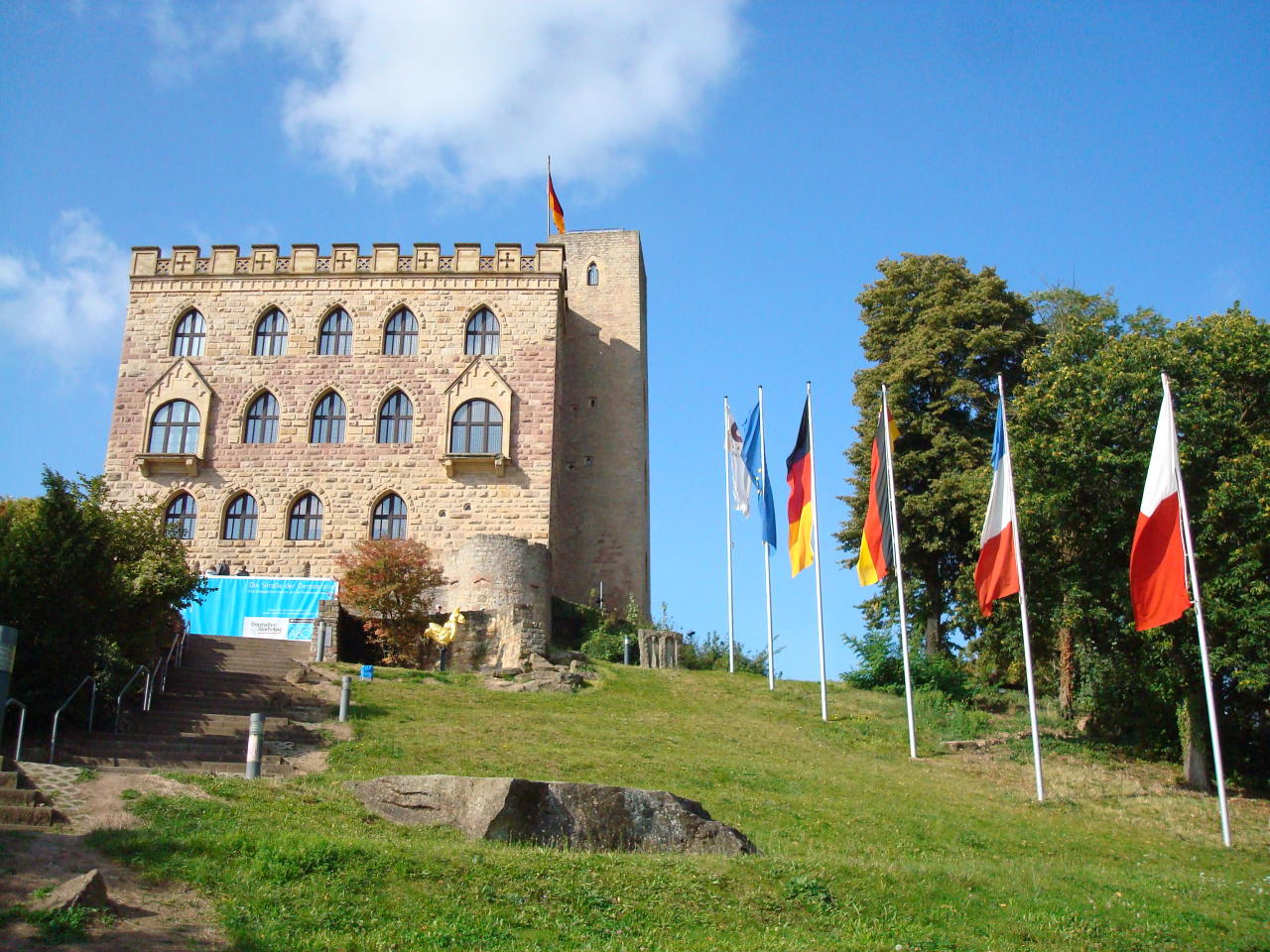
Rebuilt Hambach Castle today

The gathering had no immediate results, but is considered a milestone in German history because it was the first time that a republican movement had made its mark in the country. It was criticized as a missed opportunity, including by Heinrich Heine. The next year, about 50 insurgents tried to start a democratic revolution by charging the Frankfurt guard house (Frankfurter Wachensturm), which ultimately failed. Instead the Hambach events prompted the legalist German Federal Convention to issue its order of 28 June 1832 which again tightened the Carlsbad Decrees and completely suppressed freedom of speech. On the anniversary date in 1833, Bavarian military controlled the area and dispersed all attempts to hold another gathering. Many intellectuals retired to a non-political Biedermeier life in the following years.

The Festival also confirmed the establishment of the combination of black, red and gold as a symbol of a democratic movement for a united Germany. The colours were later used by democratic revolutionaries in the Revolutions of 1848 as a symbol of German unity, but it was not achieved until 1871 and, even then, to Otto von Bismarck's specifications. After World War I, Black-Red-Gold were adopted by the Weimar Republic as the national colours of Germany and are used on the modern German flag.

Hambach Castle became an icon of the German democratic movement. A possession of Prince Maximilian II of Bavaria from 1842, it was rebuilt in a Gothic Revival style from 1844 and is today the site of a historical exhibition.
