= Heinrich Simon =

German politician

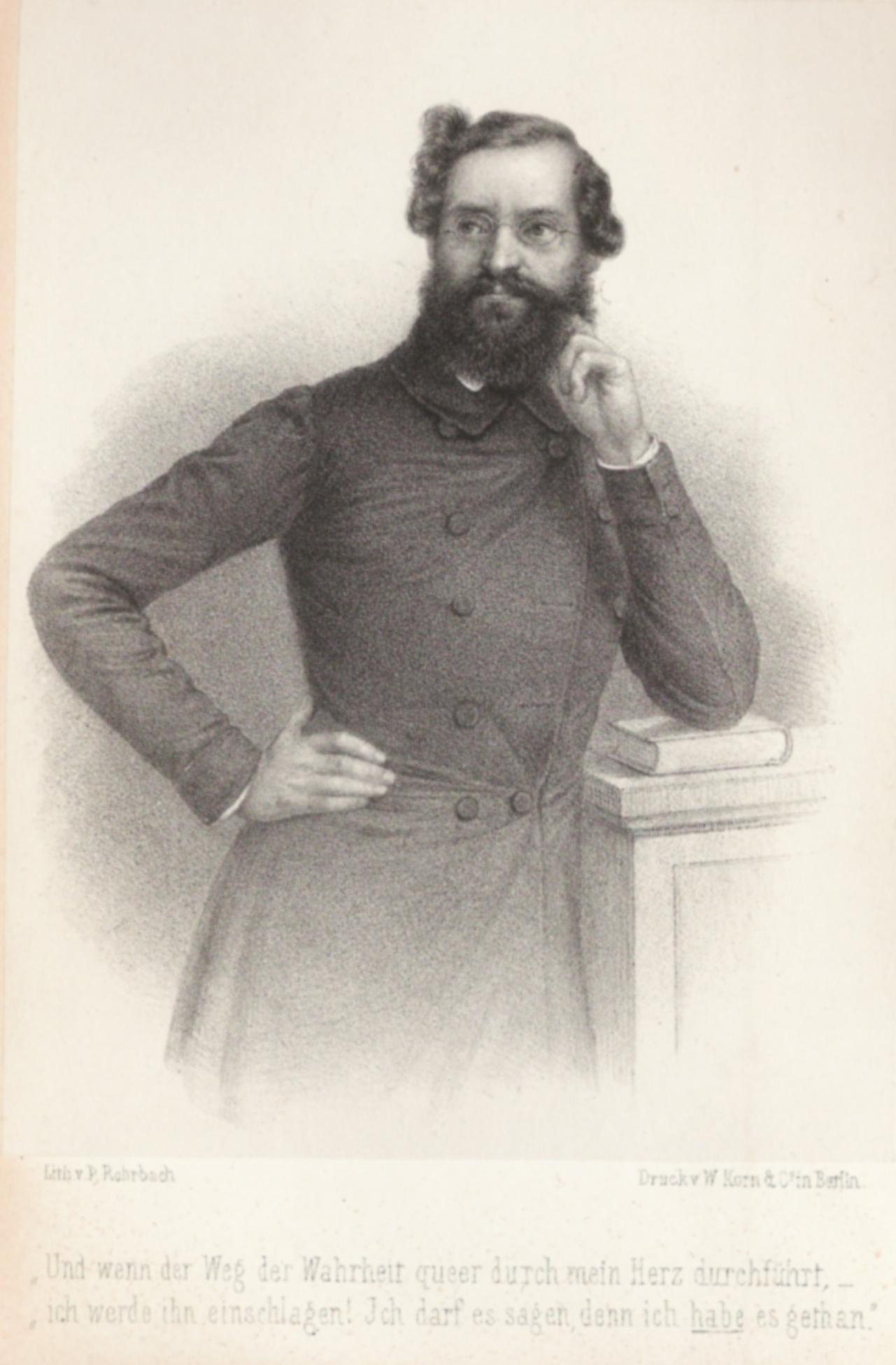
- Heinrich Simon
- Born: August Heinrich Simon; October 29, 1805; Breslau, Prussia
- Died: August 16, 1860 (aged 54); Walensee, Switzerland
- Occupation: Politician
- Known for: Member of the Frankfurt Parliament

August Heinrich Simon (29 October 1805 – 16 August 1860) was a German democratic politician.
