= Factions in the Frankfurt Assembly =

Groups or political factions that developed among delegates to the Frankfurt Parliament

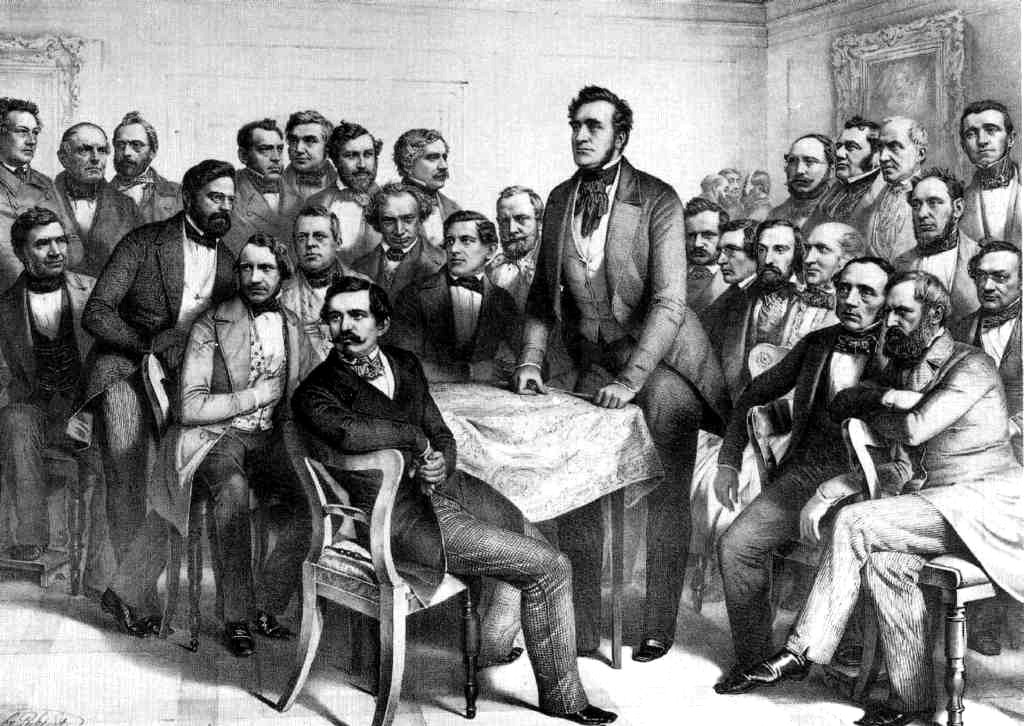
The Casino faction, in a lithograph by Friedrich Pecht

The factions in the Frankfurt Assembly were groups (German: Fraktionen) that developed among delegates to the Frankfurt Parliament that met from 18 May 1848 to 31 May 1849 in the Paulskirche in Frankfurt am Main. They coalesced as groups of like-minded representatives started meeting, and were named after the various hostelries at which they met.

The largest factions were Casino, Württemberger Hof and the United left which was also known as the Märzverein (March association).

== The United Left ==
The Left was at the time also called the "Wholes", and consisted of a coalition of extreme and moderate republicans.

=== Centralmärzverein ===
The Centralmärzverein was founded on 21 November 1848 with a stated goal to protect the "March achievements." It was formed out of the Donnersberg faction together with Deutscher Hof and Westendhall members (see below). The Centralmärzverein faction dominated the Rump Parliament during the last period of the revolution, and after the various uprisings of 1849 were suppressed, its many clubs were banned throughout Germany.

=== Deutscher Hof ===
Deutscher Hof was one of the original factions. Its members were left-wingers who advocated a democratic republic with universal direct suffrage and equal rights for all nationalities. Beginning in May 1849, when both liberals and conservatives were becoming disenchanted with the Frankfurt parliament and abandoning it, it dominated the Märzverein. Most of the Deutscher Hof deputies also participated in the rump parliament in Stuttgart that followed, and supported and in some cases participated in the revolutions in Baden and Saxony.

Members included Theodor Reh and Wilhelm Loewe, each of whom became President of the Assembly after having left it for more moderate groups, and also Robert Blum, Johann Adam von Itzstein, Johann Jacoby, Georg Friedrich Kolb, Franz Raveaux, Friedrich Schüler, Carl Vogt, and Franz Jacob Wigard.

=== Donnersberg ===
Donnersberg was a radical left-wing faction that split off from the Deutscher Hof faction on 17 May 1848. Members advocated revolution in order to create a popular democracy and guarantee the rights of the citizenry against the aristocracy, the bourgeoisie, and monied interests. They took the United States as their model. In contrast to the notion of a so-called Kleindeutschland (little Germany) that would exclude Austria (as eventually happened in the unification of Germany in 1871), they insisted on the right of self-determination; however, this was often interpreted as a German right to territories that had at some time been part of the Holy Roman Empire or one of its constituent states. Members of the Donnersberg faction thus insisted on the inclusion of Schleswig, Poznań, Bohemia, Moravia, and the Italian portions of Austria within a future all-German state and promoted nationalism. In November 1848, the faction reunited with the Deutscher Hof group and with the more radical members of Westendhall to form the Centralmärzverein.

The best known members were Lorenz Brentano, Carl Damm, Franz Joseph Damian Junghanns, Christian Kapp, Joseph Ignatz Peter, Gustav Rée, Arnold Ruge, Friedrich Schüler, Maximilian Werner, and Wilhelm Wolff. The group initially met at the Holländischer Hof inn, and relocated to a riverside establishment called the Donnersberg in September 1848.

=== Nürnberger Hof ===
The Nürnberger Hof faction was a more moderate offshoot of Deutscher Hof that split off in September 1848, led by Friedrich Karl Biedermann, Georg Friedrich Kolb, Gabriel Riesser, and Wilhelm Loewe. They objected to Robert Blum's policy of involvement in Austrian politics. Members of the faction were prominent in the campaign to implement the Frankfurt Constitution and in the rump parliament in Stuttgart.

The group met in the Nürnberger Hof, which was where merchants from Nuremberg stayed while attending the Frankfurt Trade Fair and was the largest such establishment in the Old City. It consisted of several medieval buildings around a central courtyard that had originally been an alley and that were unified in 1485. All but the north and south entrances was destroyed in the 20th century.

=== Westendhall ===
The Westendhall faction formed in July 1848 as a more left-wing offshoot of the centrist Württemberger Hof. The members supported the Frankfurt Constitution and were thus in effect republicans, but pragmatically lent some of their support to the position of the Casino faction, supporting hereditary monarchy in the decisive vote. They were denigrated by the Left as Linke im Frack (frock-coated leftwingers).

The group was led by Heinrich Simon and also included Gottlob Friedrich Federer, Wilhelm Heinrich Murschel, Franz Raveaux, Adolph Gottlieb Ferdinand Schoder, Jodocus Donatus Hubertus Temme, Friedrich Wilhelm Schulz, and Friedrich Theodor Vischer. They met at a hotel called Westendhall, which was located against the city walls between two stations, the Taunusbahnhof and the Main-Weser-Bahnhof. All these buildings have now been demolished.

== The Liberal Center ==
The Centrists were also known as the "Halves" and were a coalition of moderates of the left and the right.

=== Casino ===
Casino was a moderate liberal or center-right faction founded on 25 June 1848, its members were mostly National Liberals. It was the largest faction. Members of Casino had been influential in organizing the Assembly and were influential in its work; in particular, together with Westendhall, it pushed through the proposal in the Frankfurt Constitution for a constitutional monarchy.

Members included a large number of prominent politicians: Heinrich von Gagern and Eduard von Simson, both of whom served as President of the Assembly, Friedrich Daniel Bassermann, chairman of the Constitutional Committee, and other liberals and right-wing liberals such as Hans Adolf Erdmann von Auerswald, Hermann von Beckerath, Friedrich Christoph Dahlmann, Johann Gustav Droysen, Georg Gottfried Gervinus, Friedrich von Raumer, August Hergenhahn, Felix Lichnowsky, Karl Mathy, Gustav von Mevissen, Alexander von Soiron, Georg Waitz, and Carl Theodor Welcker.

=== Württemberger Hof ===
Württemberger Hof was a center-left or left-liberal faction that formed in July 1848. Members advocated a federalized Großdeutschland (Greater Germany, including Austria) organized as a parliamentary monarchy with strong popular representation, in which government was subordinate to the parliament. Members included Carl Joseph Anton Mittermaier, who had presided over the preliminary assembly that prepared for the Frankfurt Assembly, Friedrich Karl Biedermann, Jakob Philipp Fallmerayer, Carl Giskra, Johann Friedrich Martin Kierulff, Heinrich Laube, Julius Ostendorff, Friedrich Theodor Vischer, Heinrich Wuttke, Friedrich Joseph Zell, Adolf von Zerzog and Karl Schädler.

The group met in the Württemberger Hof, a large inn that had been erected in 1598 in the Fahrgasse, then a main artery of the Old City, as the Gasthaus Zum Goldenen Löwen (Golden Lion Inn) and renamed in 1839. The establishment was where Voltaire was detained from May to July 1753 on the orders of Frederick II of Prussia. It was demolished in 1937 as part of an urban renewal project.

=== Augsburger Hof ===
The Augsburger Hof faction formed in September 1848 as a more conservative, National Liberal offshoot of the Württemberger Hof faction, under the leadership of Carl Mittermaier and Philipp Wilhelm Wernher. Members advocated a little Germany and a hereditary constitutional monarchy, but otherwise remained substantially in agreement with the Württemberger Hof faction. The group met in the wine bar of the Augsburger Hof, an inn in Töngesgasse where merchants from Augsburg stayed during the Frankfurt Trade Fair.

In addition to Mittermaier and Wernher, members included Friedrich Karl Biedermann, August Emmerling, August Friedrich Gfrörer, Robert von Mohl, Julius Ostendorff, Gabriel Riesser, Gustav von Rümelin, Gustav von Schlör, Gustav Adolf Harald Stenzel, and Adolf von Zerzog.

=== Landsberg ===
The Landsberg faction was a moderate, somewhat left-leaning group that split off from the Casino in September 1848. Members supported strong central control with parliament playing an important role, and therefore desired stronger limitation of the powers of individual states than did other factions. They voted for constitutional monarchy. Deputies belonging to the faction included Johann Friedrich Christoph Bauer, Carl Otto Dammers, Carl Friedrich Wilhelm Jordan, Heinrich von Quintus-Icilius, and Maximilian Heinrich Rüder.

=== Pariser Hof ===
The Pariser Hof faction was a conservative offshoot of the Casino faction that was formed on 21 December 1848. Members shared most of the views of Casino, but were more strongly federalist, in particular rejecting a strong central authority and requiring the Constitution to be ratified by all the states. Deputies belonging to the faction included Carl Theodor Welcker, August Reichensperger, Johann Gustav Heckscher, and Victor Franz von Andrian-Werburg.

The group met at the Pariser Hof, a hotel in the Schillerplatz square (today An der Hauptwache, after the Hauptwache building) that was recorded as Zum Schwarzen Bock in 1709 and was where Schiller stayed in 1784 during the premiere of his Intrigue and Love. In 1809 it was rebuilt in neo-classical style and renamed Hotel à la ville de Paris, later shortened to Hotel de Paris, but was generally referred to by the German translation, Pariser Hof. The building was replaced in 1898 by a neo-renaissance edifice that housed a well known café on the first floor until it was destroyed in World War II. The site is now occupied by a 1970s commercial building and the Hauptwache S-Bahn and U-Bahn station.

== The Conservative Right ==
This bloc consisted of conservatives who wished to maintain the rights of the aristocracy, particularly Bavarians, and Prussian hegemonists.

=== Steinernes Haus ===
The conservative faction started meeting on 6 June 1848 at the Steinernes Haus (Stone Building), a building dating to 1464 that was noticeably larger than the other medieval houses in the Old City.

=== Café Milani ===
In late September 1848, the faction moved to the Café Milani. Members advocated a little Germany organized as a voluntary federation of monarchies that would retain their own armed forces and constitutions and not be controlled by the national government, with the role of the central government restricted to issues the constituent states were unable or unwilling to deal with. Most of the members were from Austria-Hungary, Prussia, and Bavaria; they included Albert August Wilhelm Deetz, Joseph von Radowitz, and Georg von Vincke.

The Café Milani had been founded in 1848 in the Roßmarkt square by an Italian, Christian Joseph Milani; it moved to other quarters beginning in 1854 and survived until the death of Adolf Milani, the founder's son, in 1931.

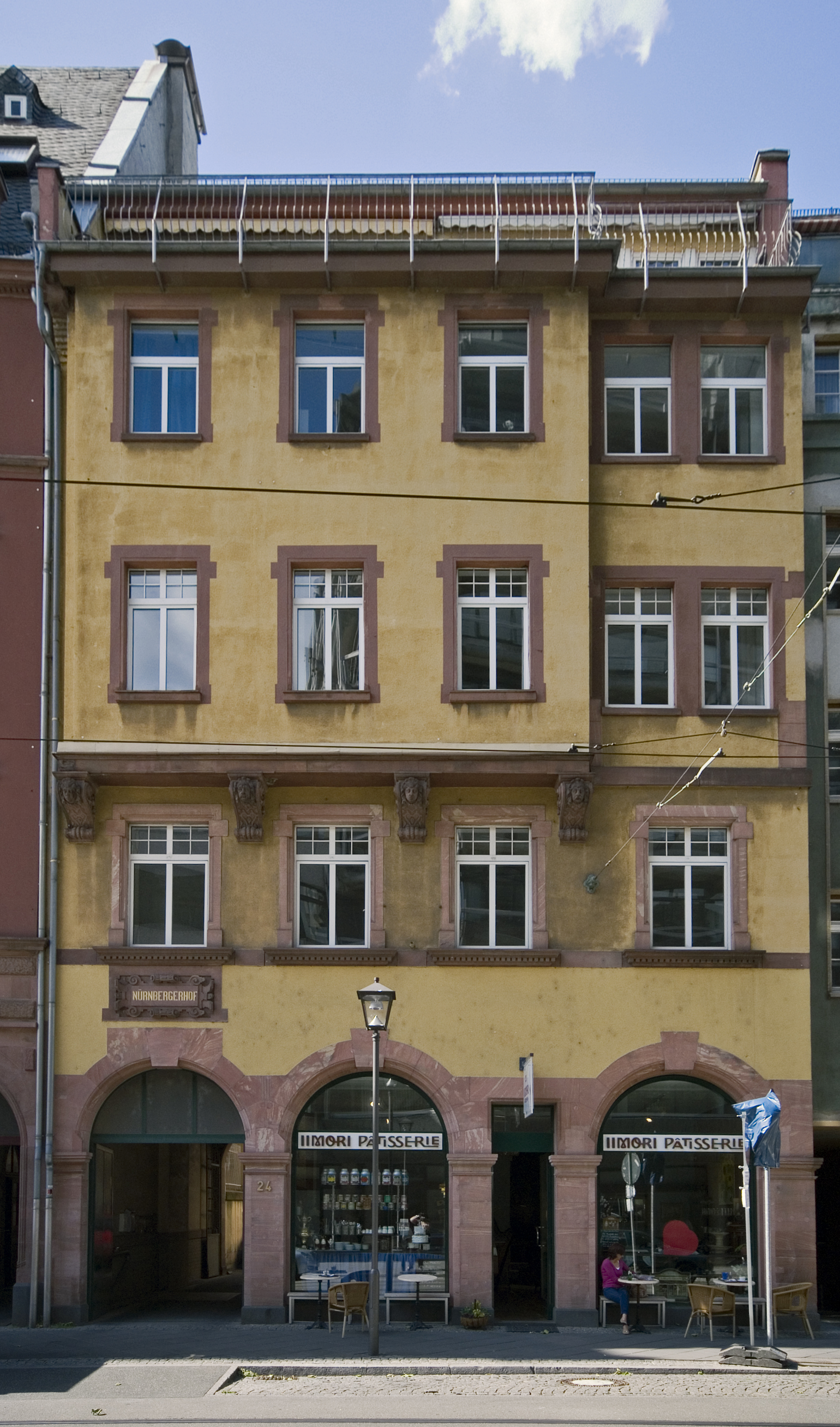
Southern entrance to the Nürnberger Hof as preserved today as part of a later building

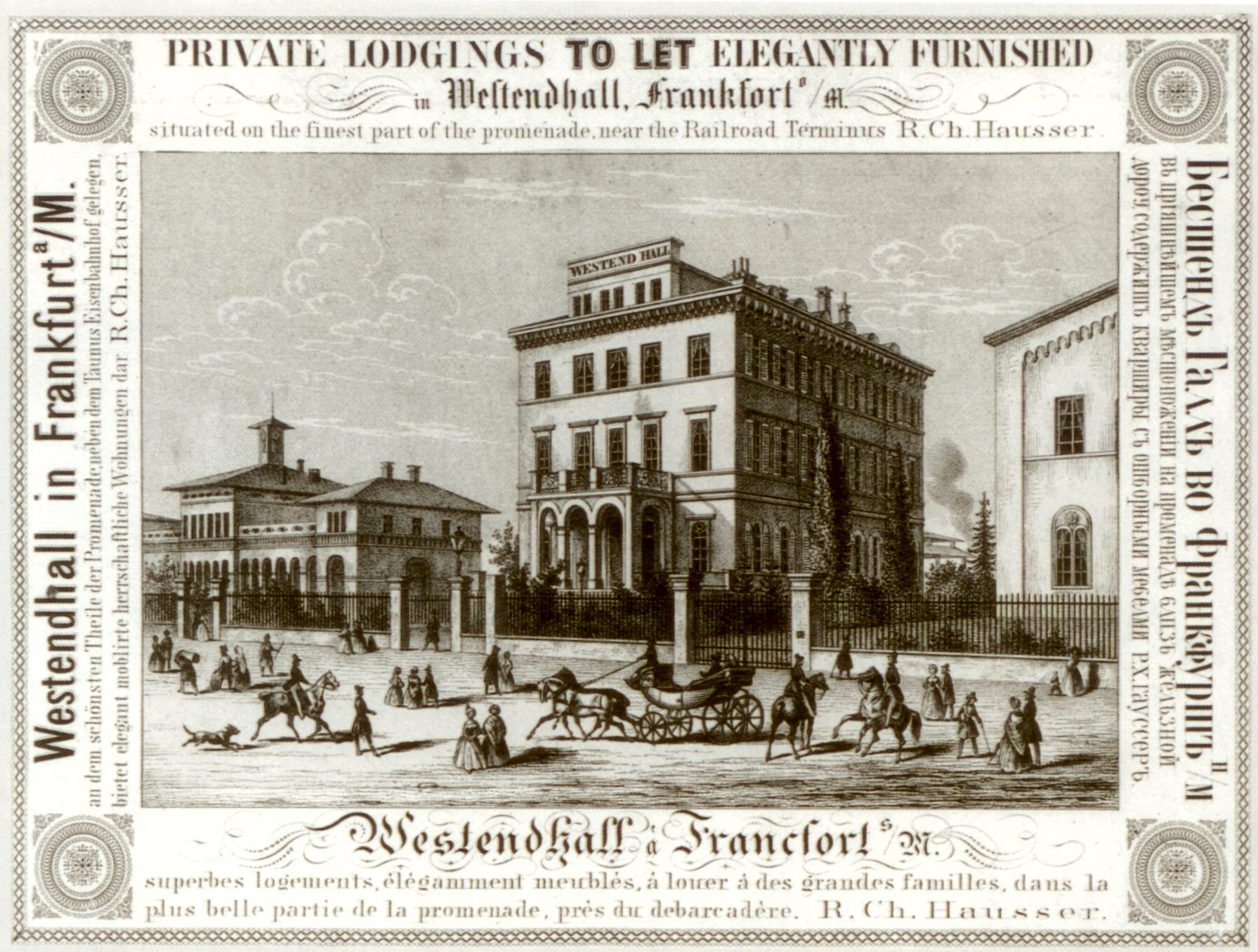
Hotel Westendhall in an 1853 advertisement

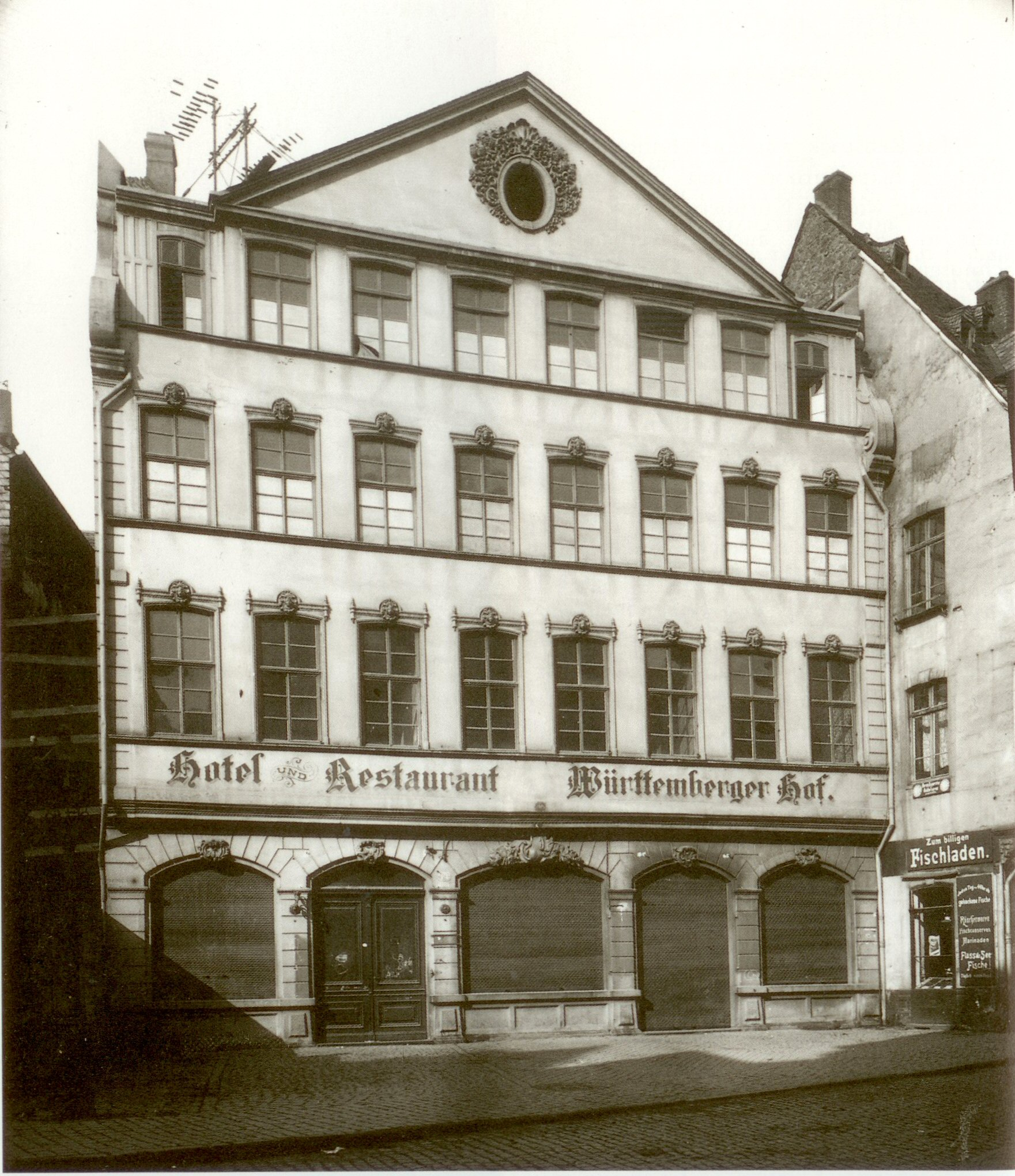
The Württemberger Hof, photographed around 1900

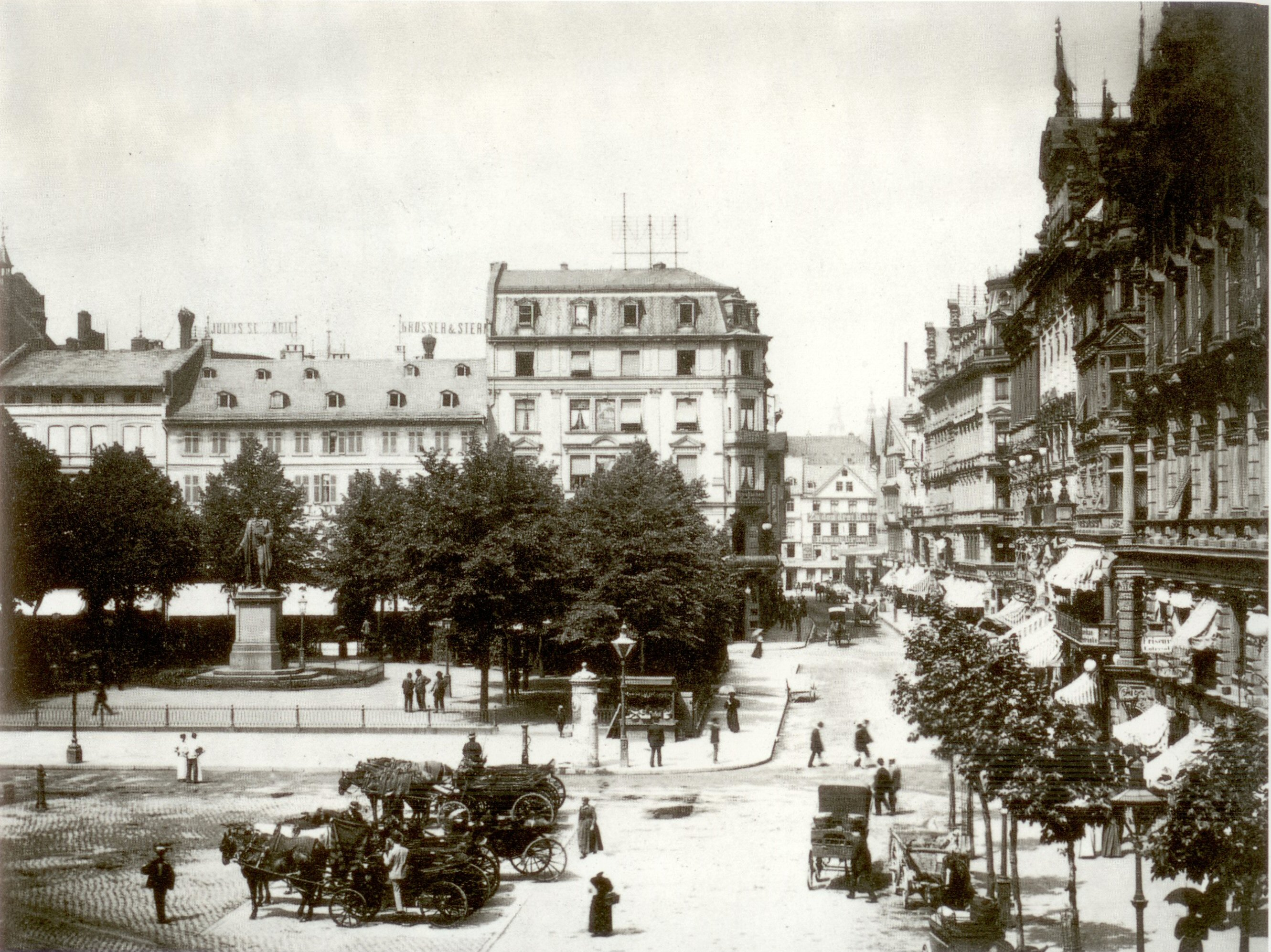
Pre-1898 photograph showing the Pariser Hof (behind the Schiller Memorial)

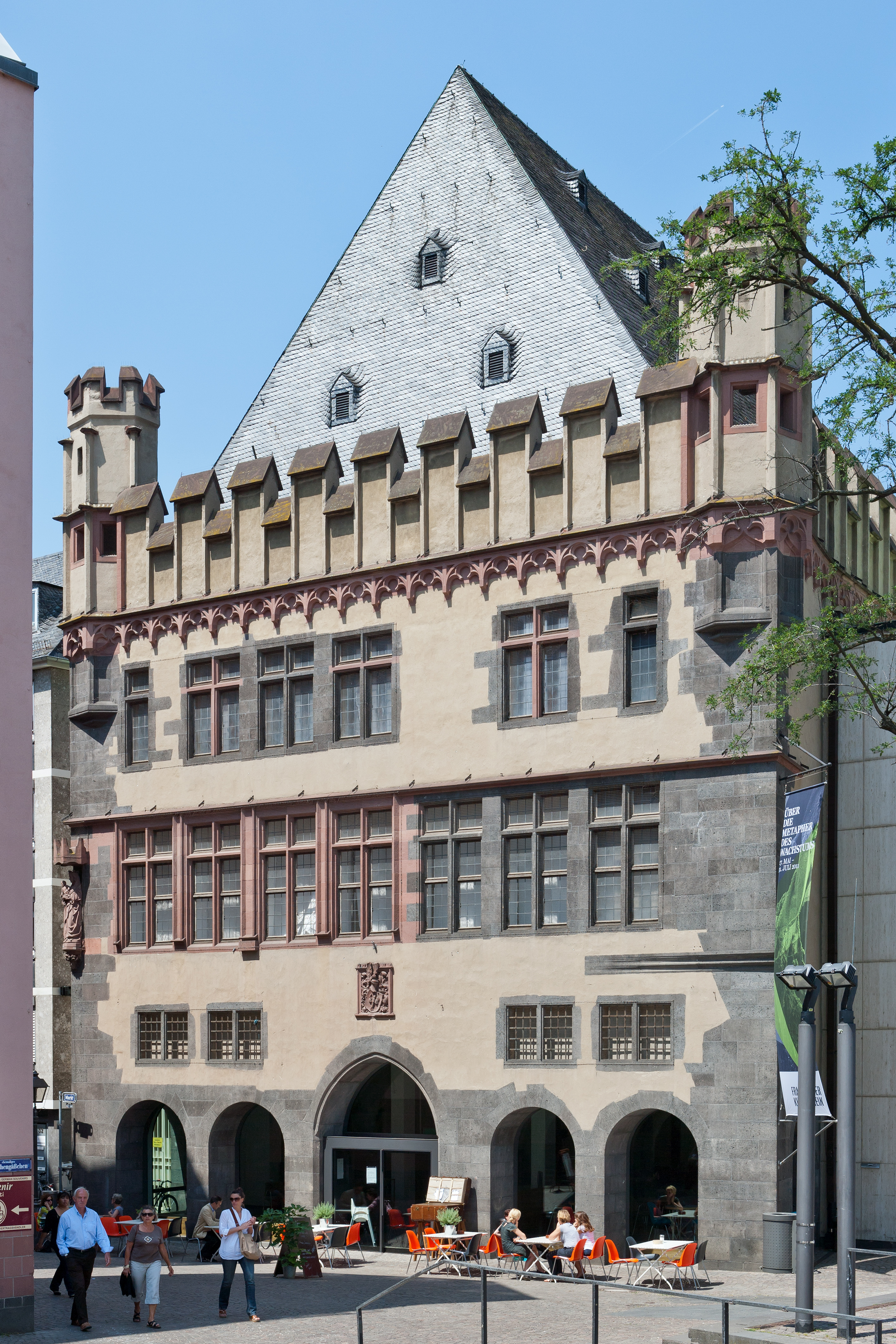
The Steinernes Haus, rebuilt after World War II and now the home of the Frankfurter Kunstverein

== Sources ==
- Heinrich Best and Wilhelm Weege. Biographisches Handbuch der Abgeordneten der Frankfurter Nationalversammlung 1848/49. Handbücher zur Geschichte des Parlamentarismus und der politischen Parteien 8. Düsseldorf: Droste, 1996. ISBN 978-3-7700-5193-9 (in German)
