= 1848 German federal election =

Federal elections in Germany in 1848

- 1 May 1848

All 649 seats in the Frankfurt Parliament
- Turnout: 40–75% depending on the state
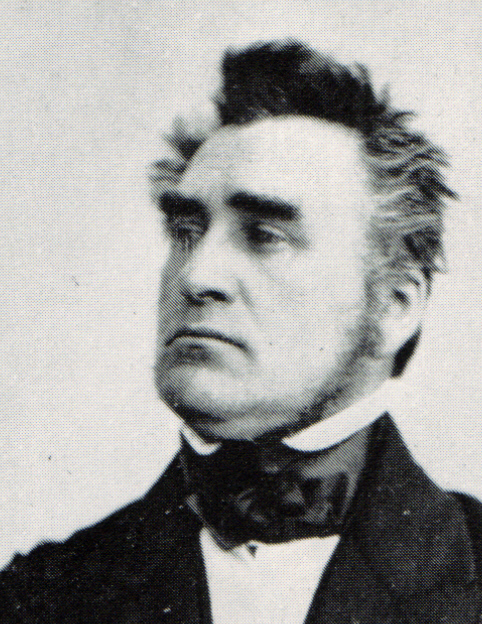

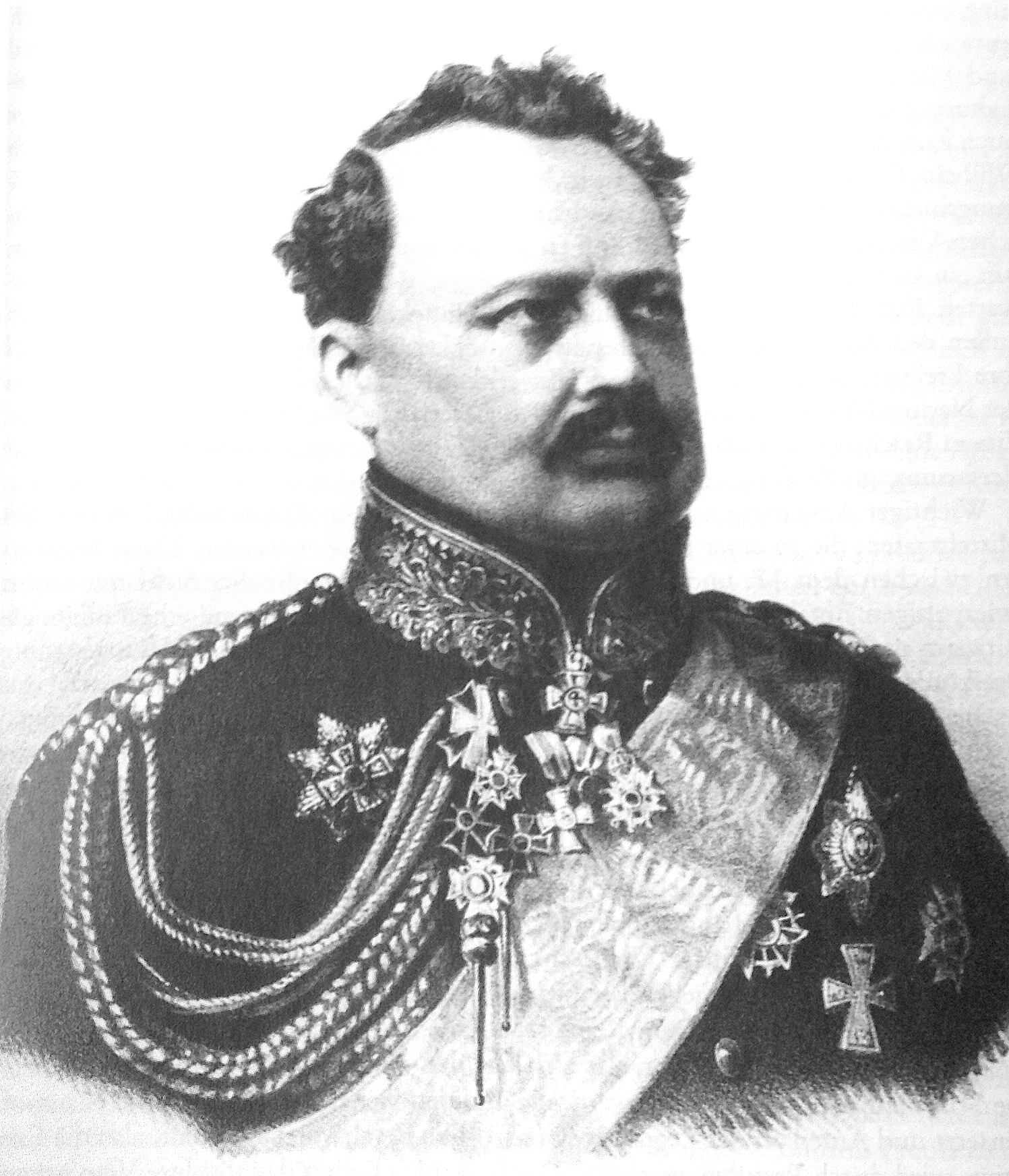

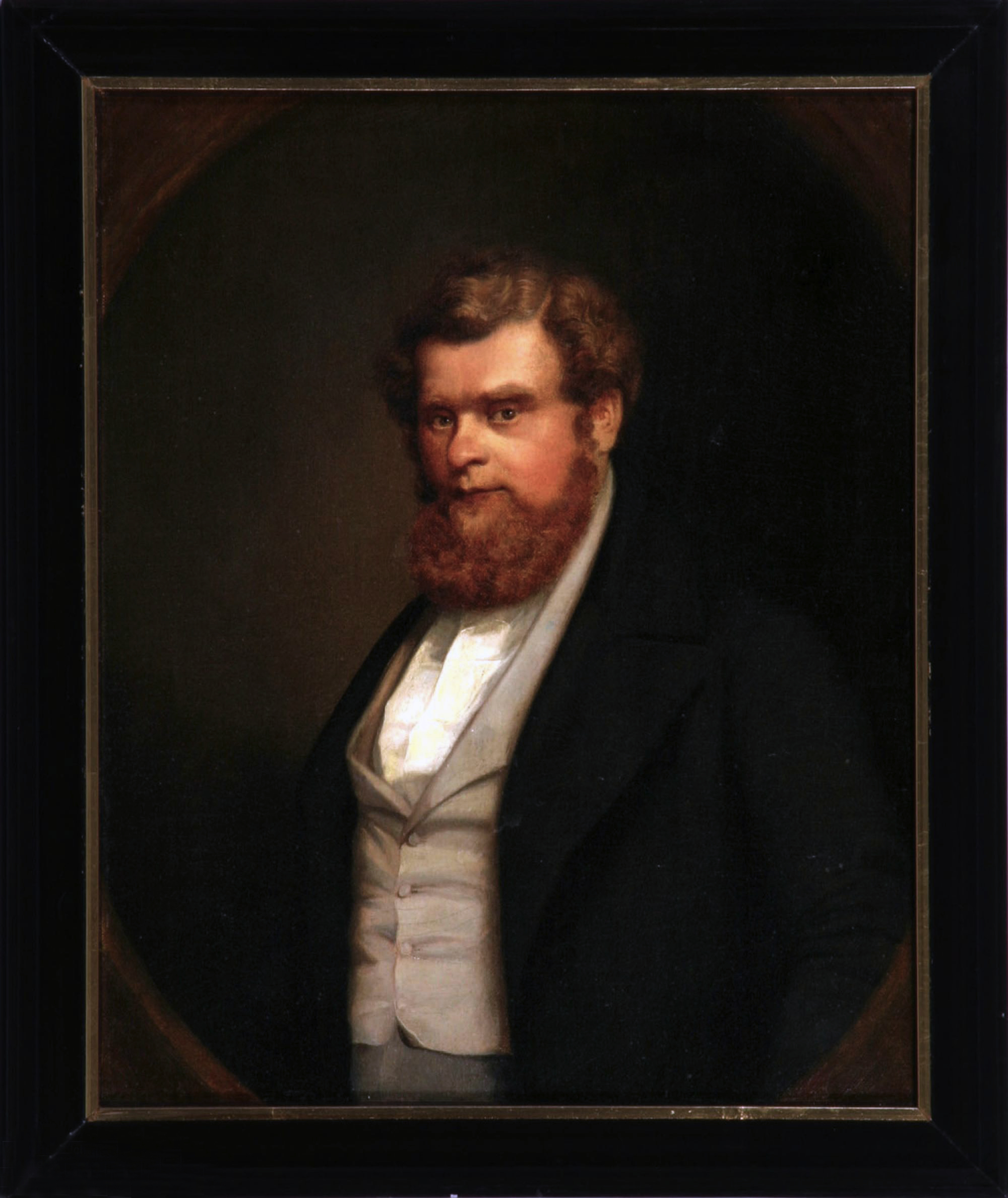
	Majority party	Minority party	Third party
Leader	Heinrich von Gagern	Joseph von Radowitz	Robert Blum
Party	Liberal	Conservative	Democratic
Leader's seat	Hesse-Darmstadt	Westphalia	Gera-Greiz
Minister-President after election
The Prince of Leiningen
Independent

Federal elections were held in all the 38 states of the German Confederation on 1 May 1848 to elect members of a new National Assembly known as the Frankfurt Parliament. The ballot was not secret, and elected 585 members, mostly from the middle class.

== Background ==
The Pre-Parliament (Vorparlement) convened in the Paulskirche in Frankfurt on 31 March 1848 and ended on 30 May 1849. Most of the 521 members of it were from South and West Germany, including 2 from Austria. There were 141 representatives from Prussia, of which 100 were from the Rhineland with a strong liberal tradition. The Pre-Parliament dispersed on 3 April having appointed a committee of 50. The radicals Friedrich Hecker and Gustav Struve were excluded as they had walked out; they had favored the abolition of both hereditary monarchy and standing armies, and a Federal constitution on North American lines. The rebuffed Hecker proclaimed the German Republic in Baden on 12 April, but the so-called Heckenputsch failed within a week. Hecker escaped to Switzerland and became a farmer in the United States. Later Struve also went into exile (in Switzerland and the United States) before returning to Germany.

== Electoral system ==
The Pre-Parliament had favoured universal suffrage, although individual states set their own qualifications. While Austria, Prussia and Schleswig-Holstein imposed no restrictions, farm hands were excluded in Baden and Saxony. Bavaria and Wutternberg excluded domestic servants and workers, and Bavaria included only those paying direct taxation.

== Results ==
The Pre-Parliament set the ratio of one deputy to the National Assembly per 50,000 inhabitants of the German Confederation, totaling 649 deputies. However, Czech-majority constituencies in Bohemia and Moravia boycotted the election, reducing the total to 585. Those elected included 157 judges and lawyers, 138 high officials, over a hundred university and high school teachers, and about 40 merchants and industrialists. Most of the 90 members of the nobility were in the learned professions, and there was only one peasant and four handwerkers (skilled artisans or craftsmen).

== Aftermath ==
The Frankfurt Parliament convened on 18 May at Frankfurt, when the members walked in solemn procession to the Paulskirche accompanied by the roar of cannon and the ringing of bells. It included the German political leaders of the past three decades: the political professors Friedrich Dahlmann, Johann Droysen and Georg Waitz; Ernst Arndt and Turnvater Jahn (Friedrich Jahn) from 1813; radicals like Robert Blum and Arnold Ruge; liberal nobles like Prince Felix Lichnowsky, and the Catholic leader Bishop Ketteler.
