= Casino faction =

Political faction within the Frankfurt Parliament

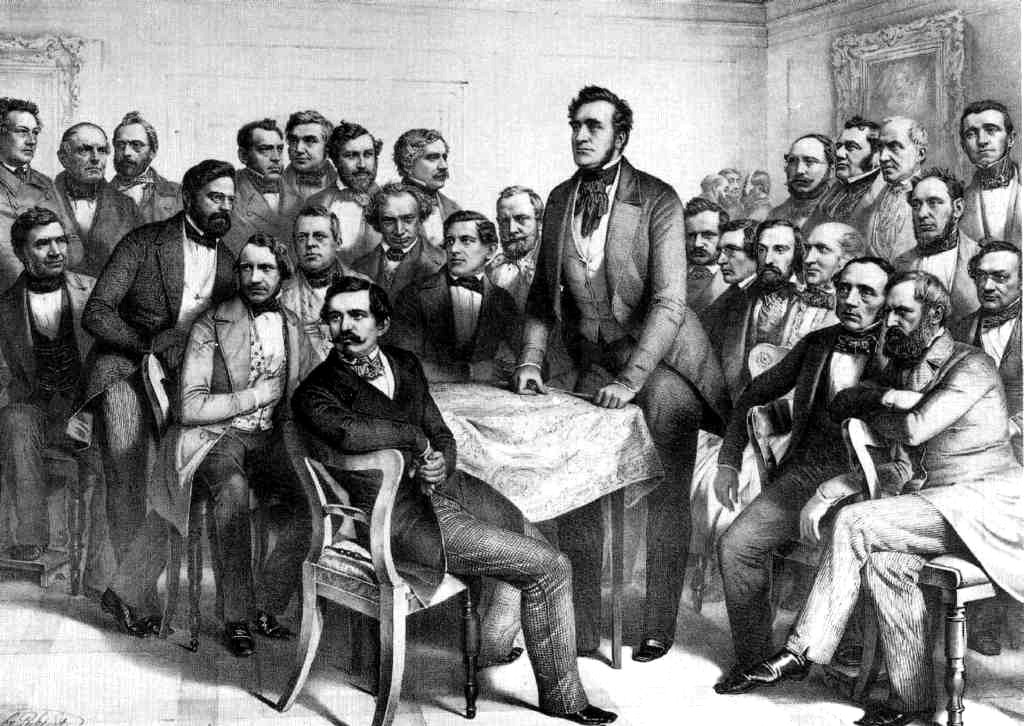
"Club de Casino," lithograph by Friedrich Pecht, 1849.

The Casino faction (in German Casino-Fraktion or simply Casino) was a moderate liberal faction within the Frankfurt Parliament formed on 25 June 1848. Like most of the factions in the parliament, its name was a reference to the usual meeting place of its members in Frankfurt am Main. Casino was the largest and most influential faction at Paulskirche. Its members were for the most part national liberals.

Casino was a faction of moderate left-wingers or liberals, or right-centrists. Its members were overwhelmingly drawn from the intelligentsia of Prussia and the rest of Northern Germany, and the group's political positions were closer to those of the right wing in the Prussian assembly than to the center-right there, whose positions corresponded to those of center-left factions at Frankfurt.

With approximately 130 members, it was the largest faction. Members of the group and their publications had played major roles in preparing for and organizing the meeting of the parliament, for example in publicity in the Deutsche Zeitung, a liberal newspaper that came to be the organ of the faction, and participation in the Heppenheim Meeting, the Heidelberg Assembly, and the Vorparlament, the preliminary assembly that met in the Paulskirche from 31 March to 3 April 1848. They also had a decisive influence on the work of the parliament, especially the Frankfurt Constitution that it produced. The majority of the Casino members joined with the Westendhall faction to form the coalition of Erbkaiserliche (hereditary imperialists) that met in the concert hall of the Gasthof zum Weidenbusch and pushed through the specification of constitutional monarchy as the preferred political form of the sought-after national state. Casino also influenced the eventual adoption of a more restricted franchise than advocated by the republican groups. Members included a large number of prominent politicians: Heinrich von Gagern and Eduard von Simson, both of whom served as President of the assembly, Friedrich Daniel Bassermann, chairman of the committee that wrote the constitution, and other liberals and right-wing liberals such as Hans Adolf Erdmann von Auerswald, Hermann von Beckerath, Friedrich Christoph Dahlmann, Johann Gustav Droysen, Georg Gottfried Gervinus, Friedrich von Raumer, August Hergenhahn, Felix Lichnowsky, Karl Mathy, Gustav von Mevissen, Alexander von Soiron, Georg Waitz, and Carl Theodor Welcker.

In September 1848, the Landsberg faction split off from Casino; its members advocated a more prominent role for the national assembly. Following the resignation of the Austrian deputy Anton von Schmerling on 21 December 1848, the Casino members who preferred a "Greater Germany" including Austria likewise split off under the leadership of Karl Jürgens and formed the more conservative Pariser Hof.

Jacob Grimm was nominally a member of the Casino faction, but after the 5 September 1848 vote, spearheaded by Dahlmann, rescinding the Malmö ceasefire between Prussia and Denmark, he took leave of absence and then resigned as a deputy.

Unlike most of the factions, the Casino's meeting place was not an inn or cafe, but a self-improvement and networking club.
