= Landsberg faction =

Political faction within the Frankfurt Parliament

Landsberg was the name of faction that started in September 1848 as part of the National Assembly in Frankfurt. As with most factions of the National Assembly, the name refers to the usual place of assembly of the faction members in Frankfurt am Main.

The faction was a split off of the national - liberal Casino faction and the left-liberal faction Württemberger Hof.

The Landsberg faction assembled members of the right liberal, especially from the southwest, Rhine middle and the north German professors.

The faction supported a strong central power with a strong parliament and therefore wanted to curtail the rights of the individual states more than other political groups. They also supported a constitutional monarchy. It included politicians such as Johann Friedrich Christoph Bauer, Carl Otto Dammers, William Jordan, Heinrich von Quintus Icilius and Maximilian Heinrich Rüder.

== Origin ==
The Landsberg faction was an offshoot of the larger Casino faction which was a moderate liberal faction within the Frankfurt Parliament formed on June 25, 1848.

Casino was the largest and most influential faction at Paulskirche. Its members were for the most part national liberals.

Casino was a faction of moderate left-wingers or liberals, or right-centrists. Its members were overwhelmingly drawn from the intelligentsia of Prussia and the rest of Northern Germany, and the group's political positions were closer to those of the right wing in the Prussian assembly than to the center-right there, whose positions corresponded to those of center-left factions at Frankfurt.

Members of the Casino and their publications had played major roles in preparing for and organizing the meeting of the parliament, for example in publicity in the Deutsche Zeitung, a liberal newspaper that came to be the organ of the faction, and participation in the Heppenheim Meeting, the Heidelberg Assembly, and the Vorparlament, the preliminary assembly that met in the Paulskirche from March 31 to April 3, 1848. They also had a decisive influence on the work of the parliament, especially the Frankfurt Constitution that it produced. The majority of the Casino members joined with the Westendhall faction to form the coalition of Erbkaiserliche (hereditary imperialists) that met in the concert hall of the Gasthof zum Weidenbusch and pushed through the specification of constitutional monarchy as the preferred political form of the sought-after national state. Casino also influenced the eventual adoption of a more restricted franchise than advocated by the republican groups.

In September 1848, the Landsberg faction split off from Casino; its members advocated a more prominent role for the national assembly.

Following the resignation of the Austrian deputy Anton von Schmerling on December 21, 1848, the Casino members who preferred a "Greater Germany" including Austria likewise split off under the leadership of Karl Jürgens and formed the more conservative Pariser Hof.
