= Gustav Droysen =

Gustav Droysen may refer to:

- Johann Gustav Bernhard Droysen (1808–1884), German historian (best known as Johann Gustav)
- Johann Gustav Ferdinand Droysen (1838–1908), German historian (best known as Gustav)
