= Altentreptow =

Town in Mecklenburg-Vorpommern, Germany

- Town
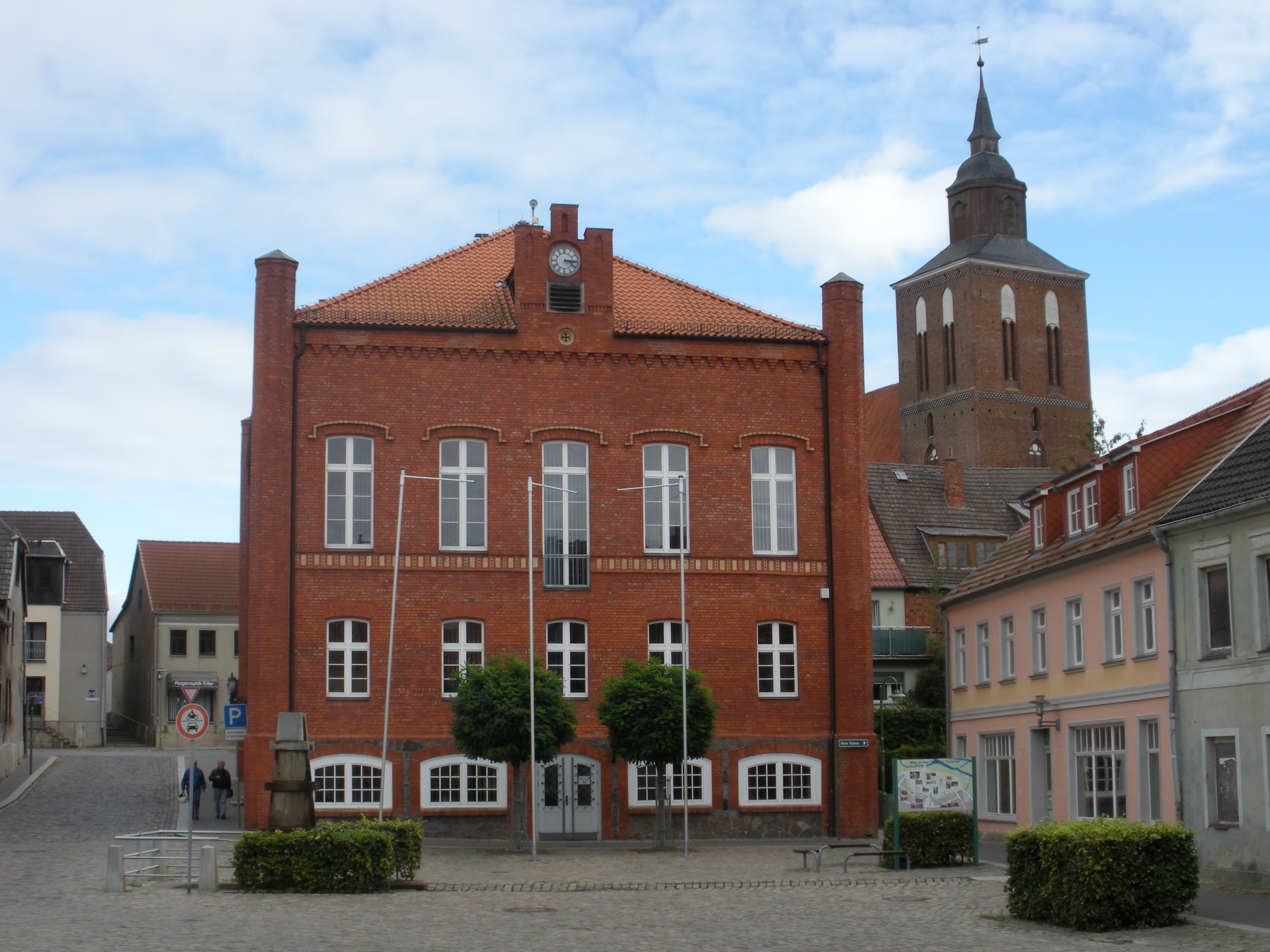
- Town hall at market square, Protestant church of St. Petri

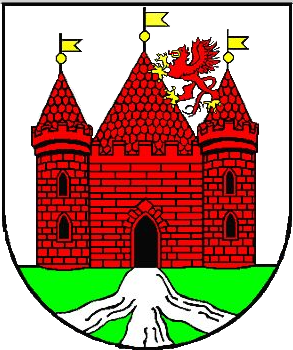
- Coat of arms

- Location of Altentreptow within Mecklenburgische Seenplatte district
- Interactive map of Altentreptow
- Location within Germany Location within Mecklenburg-Vorpommern
- Coordinates: 53°40′N 13°15′E
- Country: Germany
- State: Mecklenburg-Vorpommern
- District: Mecklenburgische Seenplatte
- Municipal assoc.: Treptower Tollensewinkel
- Subdivisions: 8 Ortsteile

Government
  - Mayor: Claudia Ellgoth

Area
  - Total: 53.08 km^{2} (20.49 sq mi)
- Elevation: 15 m (49 ft)

Population (2025-12-31)
  - Total: 4,903
  - Density: 92.37/km^{2} (239.2/sq mi)
- Time zone: UTC+01:00 (CET)
  - Summer (DST): UTC+02:00 (CEST)
- Postal codes: 17087
- Dialling codes: 03961
- Vehicle registration: DM
- Website: www.altentreptow.de

Altentreptow (German pronunciation: [altn̩ˈtʁeːpto]) is a town in the Mecklenburgische Seenplatte district, in Mecklenburg-Western Pomerania, Germany. It is situated on the river Tollense in Western Pomerania, 15 km north of Neubrandenburg. Until 1939 the city's name was Treptow an der Tollense.

== History ==
The origins of the town go back to a Slavic settlement that grew up around a fortress located on a small hill, where the town church lies today. The name Treptow is mentioned for the first time in 1175, in reference to the establishment of a monastery on the site, which however later moved to Verchen. The present town was most probably founded in the early 13th century, and is referred to as a "civitas", i.e. Latin for "city", in 1245. In 1282, a document confirms that the town was ruled by Lübeck law. The medieval town had three churches, of which only one survives, as well as a medieval hospital and a system of double defensive walls built before 1360. The town has suffered much destruction through fire and war during the centuries, and in 1743 the town walls were almost completely removed. Two city gates from c. 1450 still survive; the Brandenburger Torturm and the Deminner Torturm. Of the latter, only the ground floor remains, with additions and alterations made in the 19th century.

== Notable people ==
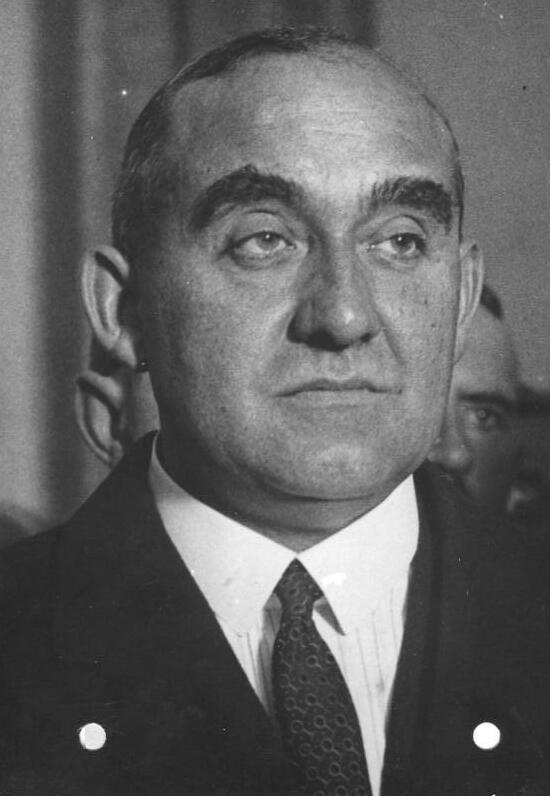
Albert Grzesinski, 1926

- Johann Christoph Droysen (1773–1816), a German field and garrison preacher
- William Hentschel (1874–1925), local poet
- Albert Grzesinski (1879–1947), Prussian Minister of the Interior from 1926 to 1930 (SPD)
- Manfred Schmidt (1929–2005), German theologian and politician (CDU)
- Ilse Kaschube (born 1953), sprint canoer, team silver medallist at the 1972 Summer Olympics
- Christine Wachtel (born 1965), German athlete, silver medallist at the 1988 Summer Olympics

== Related to Altentreptow ==
- Fritz Reuter (1810–1874), poet and writer
- Joachim Rohde (1944-2022) German Athlete - Tennis Borussia Berlin (60’s/70s)
- Sybille Kempf (born 1945), mayor after the turn from 1992 to 2012
- Sebastian Zbik (born 1982), German Boxer
