= Johann Christoph Droysen =

Johann Christoph Droysen (1773, Treptow an der Tollense (modern-day Altentreptow) – 1816, Treptow an der Rega (modern-day Trzebiatów, Poland) was a German field and garrison preacher. He was the father of the 19th-century historian Johann Gustav Droysen.

== Life ==
Johann Christoph Droysen was born in 1773 in Treptow an der Tollense, the youngest son of shoemaker Christoph Droysen. Despite the poor condition of his father, he studied theology from 1792 to 1794 at the Martin Luther University of Halle-Wittenberg, was a tutor and soon after field preacher in a Cuirassier Regiment in Treptow an der Rega (modern-day Trzebiatów). In 1804, he married Friederike Kasten, the daughter of a Treptower ironworker.

After the defeat of Prussia in the Battle of Jena–Auerstedt in 1806, he had to leave the family and went with his regiment to Kołobrzeg. From there, he took part in several military raids and made friends with Joachim Nettelbeck and Karl Wilhelm Ernst von Waldenfels, who died mortally wounded in his arms after storming the Wolfsbergschanze.

After the Treaties of Tilsit were signed in 1807, Droysen served in the headquarters of Blücher and came back as a garrison preacher to Treptow an der Rega. He also had to give private lessons to support his family. At this time, he had hemoptysis. In 1812, he was able to take over the diaconate in Greifenhagen. In 1814, Droysen returned to Treptow an der Rega as Superintendent and First Pastor, but died just two years later.
