= Victor Franz von Andrian-Werburg =

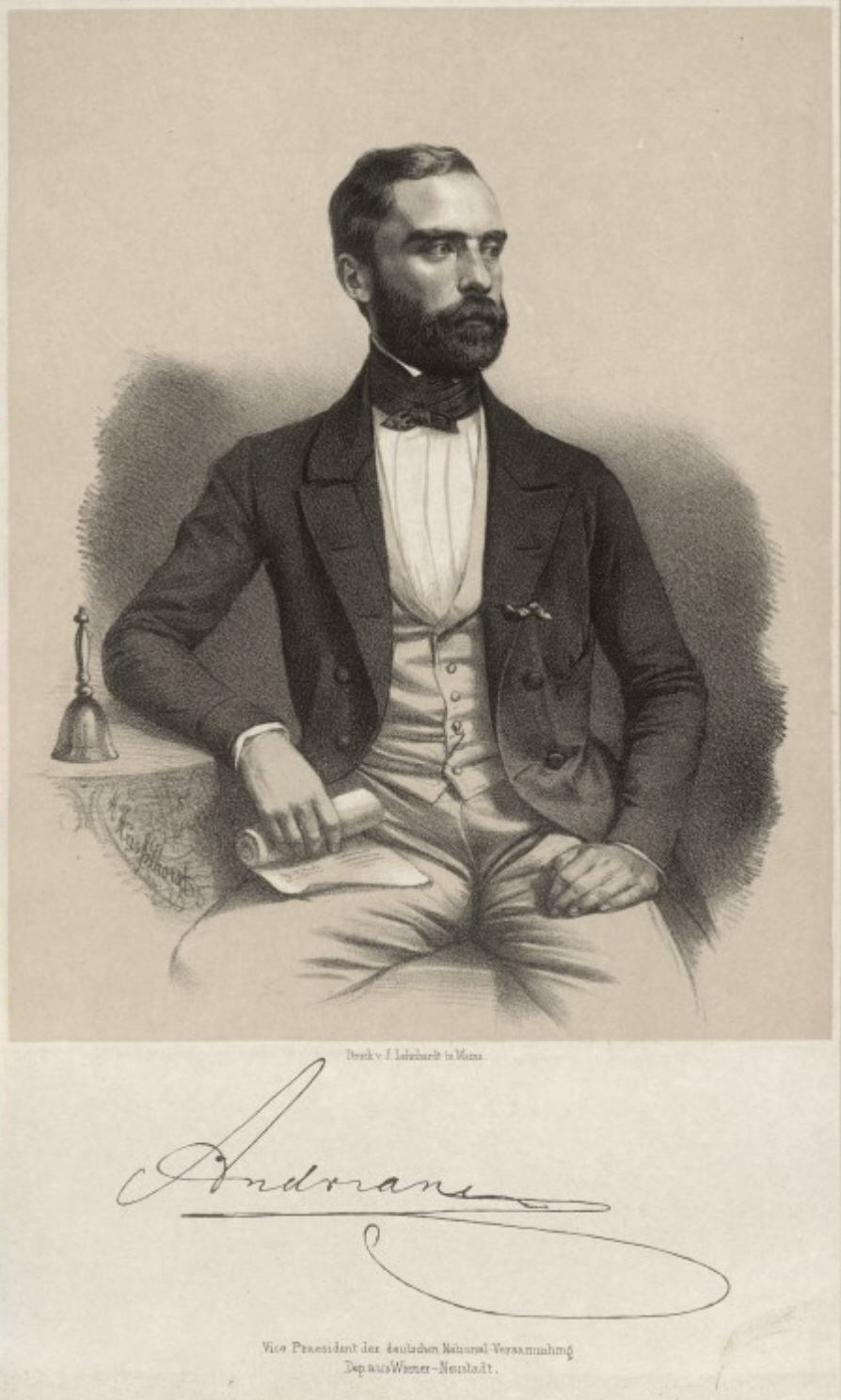
- Born: 17 September 1813; Gorizia, Italy
- Died: 25 November 1858 (aged 45); Vienna, Austrian Empire
- Occupation: Austrian politician

Victor Franz Freiherr von Andrian-Werburg (17 September 1813 – 25 November 1858) was an Austrian politician, most notably as a member of the Frankfurt Parliament.

== Early life and career ==
Andrian was born on 17 September 1813 in Gorizia. He studied jurisprudence in Vienna from 1829 until 1833 and then worked in the Austrian civil service in Venice, Milan, and Vienna. Although typically seen as a liberal because of his "argument that Austrian society could be liberated from the oppressive bureaucratic central state" his intentions seem to recall "more freedom for the landed nobility at the level of local government. This included the landed nobility’s “liberation” from the increasingly onerous and expensive obligations to run the local, patrimonial administration." John David Deák argues "Andrian-Werburg thus spoke for resurgent conservatism, one that recalled the estates in their resistance to Joseph’s state reforms in the 1780s." Deák goes onto write that "Andrian-Werburg egotistically saw his own stunted career as a metaphor for Austrian society as a whole." As he "was increasingly frustrated by his own stifled career." As "A scion of an old noble family of Lombardy, Andrian-Werburg felt entitled to rise quickly through the ranks of bureaucracy and became deeply frustrated when the reality of service in Austria’s administration confronted his high hopes with a rather ordinary and slow-moving career." In 1841, he published the first part of a treatise entitled "Austria and its future", in which he propose an expanded role for the aristocracy in the functions of the Austrian state:

"We will no longer remain contented with what we have: the monopoly of official situations and the guarantee of the status quo are by far too miserable prerogatives for us. We claim a share of power. We, the vassals of the crown, must henceforth be endowed with the regulating powers of the state, while the executive shall remain vested in the sovereign. With respect to the people, our dependents shall fill the places vacated by the nobles of the land, whose duties henceforth shall consist solely in matters of government, the office of the district governors being altogether abolished. Our prerogatives are totally and permanently inviolable. All laws must emanate from us, the select and illustrious of the land, in whom the authorities of the provinces and of the state are centered; and should these conditions not be accorded, we at once throw down the gauntlet, and will enforce them by open rebellion."

In 1844, he became a court secretary to the Imperial Chancellery, and behaved as an enlightened politician in the sense of the English aristocracy. However, he left government service in early 1846, adopted a lively interest in various aristocratic movements and, in 1847, published the second part of the above-mentioned work in Hamburg. At the same time, he anonymously wrote tracts displaying the sense of feudal opposition within Austria to the Metternich System of governance.

== The National Assembly ==
Beginning in April 1848, Andrian was sent by the estates of Lower Austria to the Vorparlament at Frankfurt, where he was elected as one of the Committee of Fifty (Fünfzigerausschuss) to direct the various states in electing members to the National Assembly, and was Director of the Central Committee for the Elections. He was elected to the National Assembly representing Wiener Neustadt from the first sitting on 18 May 1848 until 30 March 1849. He belonged to the numerically superior Casino faction. He was elected Vice President of the National Assembly, and was also a member of the Constitution Committee and the Central Election Committee. Andrian was at the head of the deputation that interviewed the Archduke John prior to his election as Reichsverweser or regent of the Provisional Central Power of the German Empire.

At the beginning of August 1848, Andrian was appointed Provisional Envoy in London. While there, he represented the National Assembly on the questions of the Austro-Italian War and the Schleswig-Holstein War as best he could, but was recalled by the Regent when the Austro-German Question came to the fore in Frankfurt. He also traveled to Kremsier to participate in the drafting of the Kremsier constitution for Austria. At the end of January 1849, he returned to Frankfurt.

On the day after the National Assembly voted to elect King Frederick William IV of Prussia to be Emperor of Germany, Andrian resigned (29 March 1849). He had already returned to Vienna in early March to witness the downfall of the Kremsier Constitution and the implementation of the so-called March Constitution.

== Later life ==
In 1850, he anonymously published the treatise "Centralization and Decentralization in Austria". However, the neo-absolutism that followed the failed 1848-1849 revolutions was hostile to him, and he was criticized sharply for his earlier work.

Victor Franz von Andrian-Werburg died in Vienna on 25 November 1858 and is buried in Vienna's Central Cemetery.
