= Karl von Rotteck =

German political activist, historian, politician and political scientist (1775-1840)

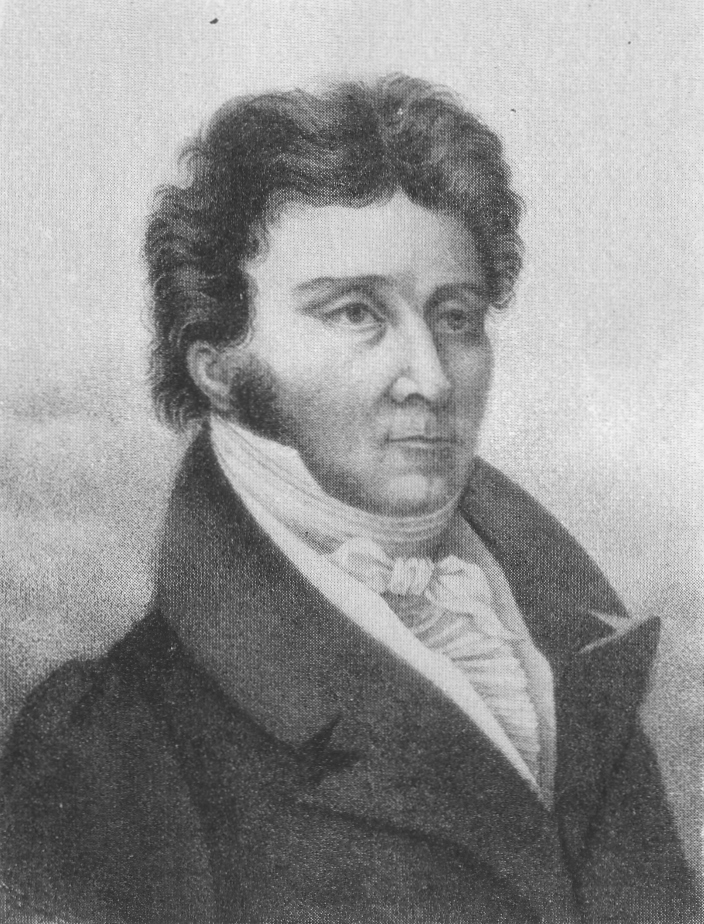
Karl von Rotteck

Karl Wenzeslaus Rodecker von Rotteck (18 July 1775, Freiburg, Margraviate of Baden – 26 November 1840, Freiburg, Grand Duchy of Baden) was a German political activist, historian, politician and political scientist. He was a prominent advocate of freedom of the press and the abolition of compulsory labor.

== Biography ==
=== Origins and education ===
Rotteck’s father was a physician raised to the nobility by Emperor Joseph II, and a professor of medicine at the University of Freiburg. His mother came from a noble line from Lothringen (Poirot d'Ogeron). Karl was reared as a Catholic, and was a talented and industrious scholar. At 15, he began attending the University of Freiburg, where he studied jurisprudence. During the preparatory philosophical courses, Rotteck got to know the first Protestant professor of the university, Johann Georg Jacobi, whose teaching and society were major influences on him. Like many of his contemporaries, Rotteck was sympathetic with the strivings of the French for freedom in the French Revolution, but his sympathy with the Revolution was quickly extinguished by its raw realities. The invasion of his homeland by the French and the changes in land ownership which followed their victories outraged his sense of justice and his national sensitivities.

=== Early career ===
In 1797, at 22, he passed with excellence the Baden juridical exam and began his judicial career as a magistrate of the city of Freiburg. Even as a student, he had had little joy in jurisprudence, and the prosaic duties of his office completely spoiled the field for him. Having from early childhood an interest in historical studies, especially biography, he applied in 1798 for the vacated office of professor of history at the University of Freiburg and received it. In those times, the frankness with which he expressed himself and his spirited idealism compensated for his lack of objective historical knowledge, without which later no beginner would think of trying for a teaching position, to say nothing of being allowed to fill it for 20 years. He held the position until 1818. He lacked some physical requirements for teaching: he spoke monotonously, and with a weak voice. But his genuine spiritedness and outrage bound his listeners to him, and left behind ideal conceptions of how things should be arranged.

=== Allgemeine Geschichte ===
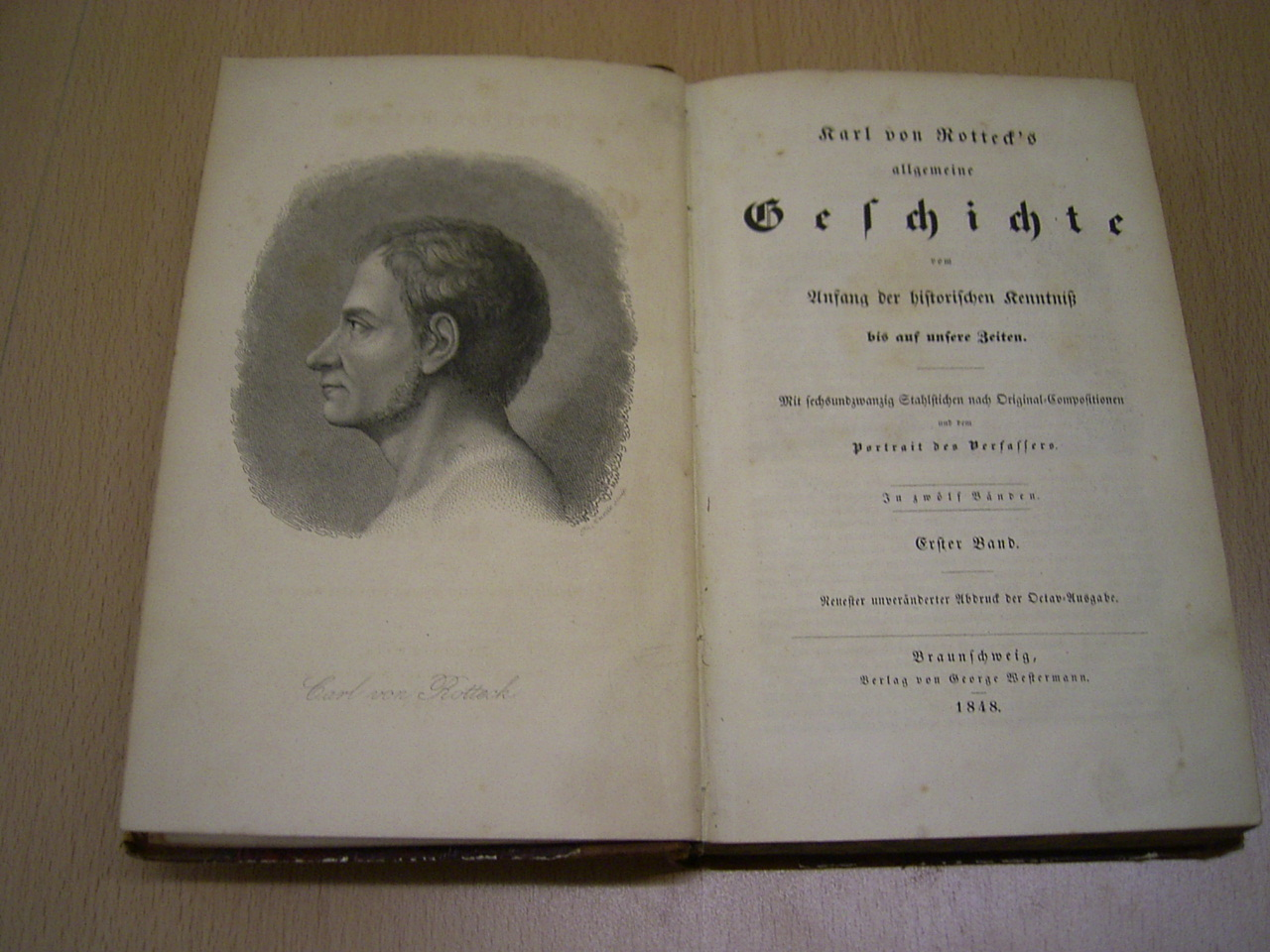
Karl von Rotteck's Allgemeine Geschichte, title page of the 1848 edition

After some time, Rotteck was no longer contented with the relatively small public provided by his lecture hall, and in 1812 he began to publish his Allgemeine Geschichte, which passed through many editions in Germany and was available in translation the world over. This work made what he presented in the lecture hall the common possession of hundreds of thousands.

In the preface he himself characterizes his work as not so much a scholarly endeavor as a persuasive and agitating one. He made no claim, he said, to widen or deepen historical knowledge. He only aimed to take the historical knowledge at hand and through an appropriate treatment make it accessible to the layperson and not only to enrich the reader of average education but also strengthen the moral will, and especially influence the character and attitude of young people coming of age. This goal the author reached in full measure. Rotteck appealed to the flawless vigor of the life of the people, to the love of freedom and fatherland; he alluded to equalizing justice in the development of nations. This little affected the relationship of the author to his closest contemporaries, but for hundreds of thousands into whose hands the book came, those who smarted under the yoke of Napoleon, it was taken as a balm in times of suffering, a call to persevere, a promise of better times.

The later volumes in the series, published after Napoleon's defeat, found a different situation in the world. In contrast to the attitude of the German governments which disappointed the fighters in the war of liberation, Rotteck's presentation of history, its exaltation of the free development of the spirit of the people, the fight for justice and self-determination over willfulness and tyranny, found a thankful and enthusiastic public. Through the publication of a four-volume extract from his Allgemeine Geschichte, Rotteck made its contents accessible to a wide audience.

=== Political scientist ===
At the university, where the revitalization of the critical method of historical research posed more earnest requirements to the practitioner than those which Rotteck could fulfill, in 1818 Rotteck exchanged his history pulpit for one in political science and natural law. In this field as well, his inclination to practical achievement felt the need to spread his teaching beyond the walls of his lecture hall, and from 1829 to 1836, he published in four volumes his Primer of political science and rational law (German: Lehrbuch der Staatswissenschaften und des Vernunftrechts) which in his mind promised to outdo the almost unprecedented success of his world history in its effect on contemporary public opinion. However these expectations were disappointed. Jean-Jacques Rousseau's ideas of a collective will on which Rotteck's theories relied had long been superseded, and the generation now coming to maturity was much too concerned with practical tasks that society needed to solve through its politics to let itself be caught up in Rotteck's abstract idealism.

=== Journalism ===
Nevertheless Rotteck's judgement on the questions of the day still had great influence, especially after he founded his organ, the Allgemeine politischen Annalen, where he commented on all worldly affairs from his pulpit of the liberal point of view. His theories, sometimes growing wildly from the foundations of rational law, expressly justified revolution as long as it didn't formally conflict with rational law. These ideas seemed to the authorities of the German Confederation to begin to become dangerous as he started to mint them in the small change of political agitation in articles in The Independent (German: Der Freisinnige) which was targeted at the public at large. He had founded this journal in 1832 in Freiburg in cooperation with Carl Welcker.

At the instance of the Bundestag, the publication of Die Freisinnige was suspended and the Annals were forbidden and Rotteck was prohibited from issuing a similar journal for the next five years. At the same time, he was dismissed from his teaching position. These actions were in accordance with the Carlsbad Decrees.

These experiences did not hinder Rotteck from entering a new large literary undertaking in 1834, once again in cooperation with his friend Welcker: the Political dictionary (German: Staatslexikon), a political encyclopedia for the spreading of liberal ideas. For a generation, the German middle class, which gravitated toward these ideas, looked for and found explanations on all questions of political life in this work, until the dissimilar, though more solid, Staatswörterbuch of Johann Caspar Bluntschli and Karl Brater superseded it.

=== Politician ===
Although his writings found a following in Europe and the world, Rotteck's practical political accomplishments were primarily devoted to the Grand Duchy of Baden, into which, in consequence of the Peace of Pressburg, his home of Breisgau had been incorporated. In 1818 when the constitution granted by the Grand Duchy gave the University of Freiburg the right to send a representative to the first chamber of the diet (German: Landtag), Rotteck's professorial colleagues turned this duty over to Rotteck. He immediately introduced important motions: One sought to set aside the regulation which made admission to studies dependent on certain preconditions. Another was directed against the perceived meddling of the Roman Curie in church life and requested an independent national Catholic church. Not less decisively did he speak out for the legal sanctioning of freedom of the press.

In the diets of 1819/20 and 1822/23 he was especially active for the abolishment of compulsory labor obligations (German: Frohnden) and tasks stemming from personal serfdom (German: Leibeigenschaft). In the treatment of these questions, he stood completely on the foundation of natural law and would hear of no compromises. An 1819 act of the second chamber abolished compulsory labor required by the state with the extra costs which resulted being absorbed by the treasury. In contrast to this arrangement, the act suggested purchasing the freedom of personal serfs. Rotteck spoke against this differing treatment. He also spoke out for abolishment of personal serfdom, which was against the spirit of the times, no less than for the abolishment of the duties associated with it.

In his point of view, Rotteck stood alone in the first chamber, and for this reason he earnestly wished to get a place in the second chamber. This wish was not quickly granted, though it is true that his colleagues decided to no longer send him to the first chamber, and in his stead sent a conservative professor of medicine. Contrary to Rotteck's desires, the government, which during the elections for 1825 and 1828 successfully exercised all its options to derail the opposition, impeded his entrance into the second chamber. His entrance into the second chamber only occurred after the succession of Grand Duke Leopold, with whom more liberal principles broke in. From 1831 until his death, Rotteck belonged to the second chamber of the Baden diet, and during these nine years he tirelessly worked for the promotion of political and economic matters which were close to his heart. He opposed Jewish emancipation in Baden.

He worked for freedom of the press. A law for protecting freedom of the press was passed in the diet of 1831, and Rotteck saw it as a result of his efforts even though it didn't fully satisfy him. At the diet of 1833, he poured out his full measure of scorn when a decree of the German Confederation dictated an early end for the youthful Baden press freedom. When the Baden ministry, which had obeyed a mighty pressure from Prussia and Austria when it had revoked the liberal press law, saw a vote of no confidence in a resolution put forward by Rotteck for the preservation of the law and rejected it as slanderous, Rotteck made a resolution for the naming of a commission which would assess the condition of the fatherland and afterward lay appropriate legislation before the second chamber. When this resolution was rejected by the chamber, he renewed it in the diet of 1835 with a motion that the government might by constitutional means achieve and give top precedence to the fulfillment and guarantee of the constitution with a law on minister responsibility, a press law and through measures for the protection of the integrity of domestic politics against inroads of the Bundestag. And when finally his stubbornness could no longer deny that there was no possibility of achieving the full freedom of the press he sought, he put before the diet of 1839 a motion which sought at least to introduce "some justice in press affairs and to mitigate the reigning press slavery."

His goal of the removal of burdensome compulsory labor, which he had started toward in the first chamber, Rotteck pursued in the second chamber with the same zeal, and his efforts were crowned with more success. When the diet of 1831 brought freedom from obligatory labor (German: Frohndfreiheit) to reality with a law, Rotteck just as soon raised his voice for the abolition of tithing (German: Zehnt). The diet of 1833 responded to that objective with a suggested model for lawmaking which would abolish the land-clearing tithes (German: Neubruchzehnt or Novalzehnt) without compensation and lift the tithe on slaughtered animals (German: Blutzehnt or Fleischzehnt) for a compensation of a fifteen-folding of one year's total, which would come half from the government treasury and half from the community from which the tithe was due.

The resistance of the first chamber to these changes aroused Rotteck's greatest resentment. But when finally through compromises by both chambers a law, which had threatened to fail due to the resistance, came to a vote, Rotteck voted against the law since it didn't represent a full victory of the law of reason over the unseemliness of the historical law. In spite of this, the people, thankful for the mitigation that had been achieved, saw Rotteck as the one to whom full credit was due for it. At this time, he stood at the height of his popularity. A witness to this popularity was the proposal that each community should find an attractive place of their tithe-free lands and plant a group of oaks and call them "Rotteck oaks." This proposal didn't come to pass, but showed the common feeling of the people.

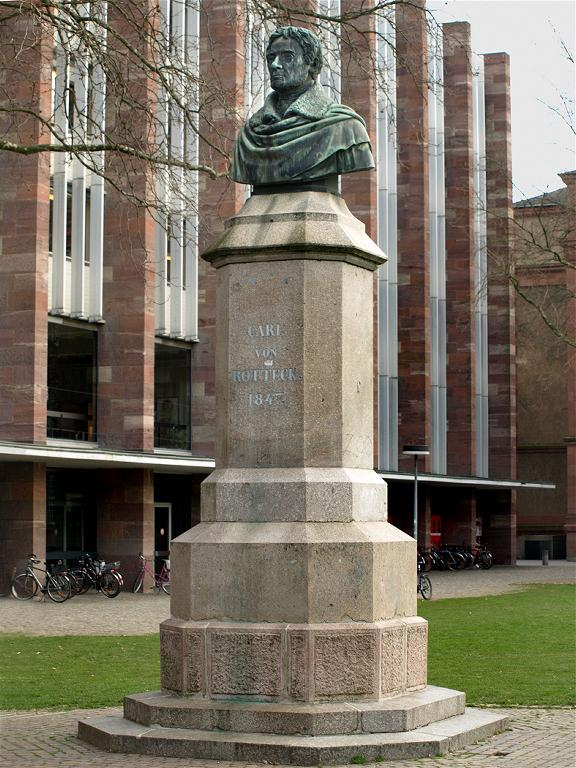
Freiburg bust

Somewhat earlier, at the beginning of 1833, to a certain extent as an answer to the dismissal of Rotteck from his teaching position, his home town of Freiburg elected him as mayor. The Baden government denied its sanction to this result and Rotteck himself advised against a second vote which threatened to create a malignant quarrel between Baden and the city of Freiburg. When it came to his person, he could give in; but when it came to, by his way of seeing things, a point of principle being in play, he remained inexorable in the position he took. Thus in the diet of 1837 he resisted with much determination the government's suggestion of division of the electorate into classes after a census, since this contradicted what he saw as a just principle of the absolute equality of all citizens. On the grounds of principle, he also opposed a treaty for incorporating Baden into the German customs union (German: Zollverein) since he saw in the closer relationship to Prussia which would thereby result the danger of a plan to undermine the constitutional life of the state. And his pamphlet on behalf of the archbishop of Cologne (Clemens August von Droste-Vischering) who had been arrested by the Prussian government, stemmed not from any sanction for clerical endeavors, but only from an abstract legal viewpoint which determined him "to protest against mixing decrees of the government in church affairs."

After Rotteck's death in 1840, the government prohibited any public gathering by which his admirers could organize the erection a memorial. Even the simple bronze bust which his friends erected on the plaza in front of the University of Freiburg in 1848 was removed in 1850 by order of the police. Only after the entry of the "new era" in 1863 were they able to erect it again, this time before his residence.

== Works ==
His principal work is Allgemeine Geschichte (9 vols., Freiburg, 1813–27), continued by Steger and Hermes to 11 vols. (25th ed., Brunswick, 1866 et seq.). Several translations of this work and an abridgment (4 vols., Stuttgart, 1830–34; 7th ed., 6 vols., 1860-61) have appeared, including an abridgement by T. Jones (4 vols., Philadelphia, 1840, reprinted in London). With Carl Theodor Welcker, Rotteck began to publish the Staatslexikon (12 vols., Altona, 1834–44; 3d ed., 14 vols., Leipzig, 1856–66).

== Family ==
His wife was Catharina Rodecker von Rotteck (née Mors) (1785-1840). Together, they had 10 children – five sons and five daughters. One of his sons, Hermann von Rotteck, was a German historian, lawyer, and publicist. The father-son duo worked on a new edition of "General History" together, which was published after Karl von Rotteck passed away.

Son Julius Rodecker von Rotteck, was a Professor of medicine. Son Karl Rodecker von Rotteck, was a lawyer, businessman, and journalist. Son Gustav Rodecker von Rotteck was a lawyer and the Baden District Court President in Freiburg. Amongst his daughters' husbands were a lawyer, a bank director, a doctor, and a district judge, respectfully.
