= Dietrich Hermann Hegewisch =

German historian

Dietrich Hermann Hegewisch (15 December 1746 – 4 April 1812) was a German historian who was a native of Quakenbrück. He was the father of political publicist Franz Hermann Hegewisch (1783-1865).

Hegewisch studied theology and history at the University of Göttingen. Following graduation he was a private tutor, then later worked as a newspaper editor in Hamburg. From 1782 to 1812 he was a full professor of history at the University of Kiel. In 1805 he was appointed Etatsrat by the Danish monarchy.

== Written works ==
He was a prolific author who published books over a wide array of subjects. His 1811 Einleitung in die historische Chronologie ("Introduction to Historical Chronology") was translated into English in 1837. Other publications by Hegewisch include:

- Geschichte der Regierung Kaiser Karls der Grossen (History of the government of Charlemagne), 1777.
- Geschichte der Fränkischen Monarchie von dem Tode Karls des Großen bis zu dem Abgänge der Karolinger (History of the Frankish monarchy from the death of Charlemagne to the Carolingian dissolution), 1779.
- Geschichte Der Deutschen Von Konrad Dem Ersten Bis Zu Dem Tode Heinrichs Des Zweyten (History of the Germans from Konrad I up to the death of Henry II).
- Geschichte Der Regierung Kaiser Maximilians Des Ersten (History of the government of Maximilian I).
- Die Aramäer oder Syrer; ein kleiner Beitrag zur allgemeinen Weltgeschichte (The Aramaeans or Syrians; a small contribution to general world history), 1791.
- Historische und litterarische Aufsätze (Historical and literary essays), 1801.
- Geschichte der Herzogtümer Schleswig und Holstein (History of the Duchies of Schleswig and Holstein), 1801-02.
- *Geographische und historische Nachrichten, die Kolonien der Griechen betreffend (Geographical and historical writings on Greek colonization); 1808, 1811.
