= Carl Theodor Welcker =

German law professor, politician and journalist (1790–1869)

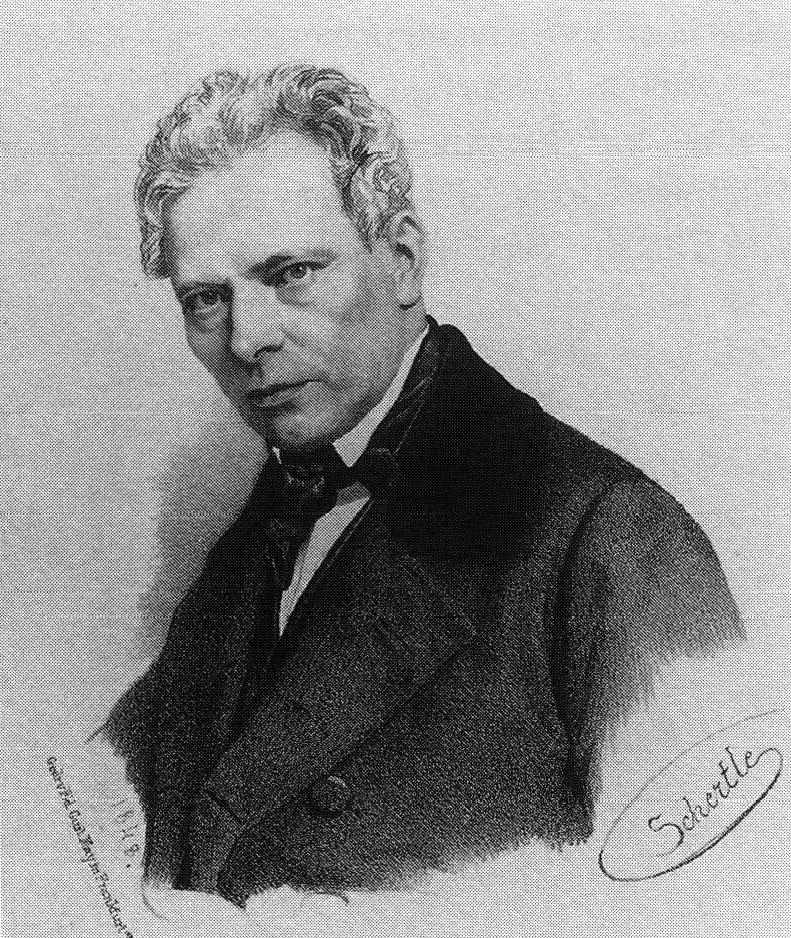
- Welcker in 1848. Lithograph after a drawing by Valentin Schertle
- Born: 29 March 1790; Oberofleiden, Landgraviate of Hesse-Kassel
- Died: 10 March 1869 (aged 78); Neuenheim bei Heidelberg, Grand Duchy of Baden

Carl Theodor Georg Philipp Welcker (29 March 1790 – 10 March 1869) was a German legal scholar, law professor, politician and journalist.

== Career ==
=== Education and early career ===
Welcker studied at the universities of Giessen and Heidelberg, and obtained his Habilitation to qualify as a Privatdozent (lecturer) in 1813 at Giessen, where he became a professor in 1814. Still in 1814, he left his alma mater to being an appointment at Kiel, where along with his academic duties he edited the Kieler Blätter, which appeared for the first time in the middle of 1815. In 1817 he was appointed to Heidelberg, where he stayed until 1819, after which he was appointed at Bonn. Here his work was hindered because of an 1817 petition to the diet (German: Landesversammlung) he had signed, which had asked for a provincial constitution. This provoked an inquiry against him which was ultimately fruitless. He defended himself against collusion in demagogic activity with a complete disclosure.

=== University of Freiburg ===
After the case was complete, he was appointed by the Grand Duchy of Baden to the University of Freiburg, where he lectured on pandects and constitutional law. Welcker attracted a following among the students. He sought to develop their enthusiasm, while his colleagues contented themselves with exercising only the students' memories. The all-encompassing character of his lectures is best understood by consulting the encyclopedic work he undertook in the 1820s titled "The inner and outer system of practical, natural and Roman-Christian-Germanic precepts of law, statecraft and lawmaking" (German: Das innere und äußere System der praktischen, natürlichen und römisch-christlich-germanischen Rechts-, Staats- und Gesetzgebungslehre).

=== Politician and journalist ===
With the political turmoil following the assumption of power of Grand Duke Leopold in Baden, Welcker entered the political field in 1830, with a campaign for freedom of the press. This was followed by his entry in 1831 into the second chamber of the Baden diet (German: Landtag), to which he had been elected by the precinct of Ettenheim in the Breisgau. He remained in the diet for nearly 20 years. In the Baden diet, Welcker continually worked, with frequent success, on behalf of the development of political machinery conducive to freedom. For almost eighteen years, he fought against censorship, particularly after the freedom of the press that had been won in 1832 was reduced to the decrees of the Bundestag of the German Confederation led by Austria.

In the short time that freedom of the press reigned in Baden, Welcker used it to establish a liberal newsletter, Der Freisinnige ("The Independent"), where he published a series of articles advocating for sincere and continuing constitutional reform and for freedom-enhancing lawmaking. He also spoke against the tendency to seek by revolutionary means that which governments denied, which was becoming more common in southern Germany. Welcker was suspended from his teaching position after Der Freisinnige was suppressed by the Confederation decree of 19 July 1832, and Welcker spoke out forcefully against what he saw as an illegal proceeding. At the same time, the University of Freiburg (where he had taken a hostile attitude towards the tendencies of the government with Karl von Rotteck and other like-minded colleagues) was closed indefinitely. In October, Welcker retired. A complaint was issued against him because of articles he had published in the Freisinnige, and he was sentenced by the Freiburg court to jail for slandering the government. This sentence was set aside by a higher court in response to an appeal.

Welcker then moved his fight against the government to the diet. He was reproached for both indiscriminate opposition and for a barren cult of phraseology. Contrary to the first claim, in spite of his frequent oppositional stance, he had cooperated zealously in areas where he found himself in agreement with the government. With respect to the second, he was given to a lofty manner of speaking which was more often directed to listeners in the gallery and the public at large than to his colleagues.

Occasionally he directed personal attacks against ministers, and the government's proceedings against him were also often sharp and ruthless. He was opposed with sharp tones not only in the chamber but (with the help of the censors) his speeches were also recorded in the newspapers in edited form with his justifications left out. He was personally slandered many times. The influence of the government made his reelection in 1837 in the Ettenheim precinct impossible. He reoccupied his professorship at the University of Freiburg in 1840, but this was taken away from him for a second time in 1841 because of his attitude in the diet. However, in new elections after the chamber was dissolved in 1841, his old Ettenheim precinct gave him the satisfaction of electing him again as their representative.

Most of the proposals he had made in the second chamber in the years 1835-1841 were of such a character that if they had succeeded in being accepted, the government would not have allowed them to become law. However with Friedrich von Blittersdorf's departure from the ministry, the conflict between the diet and the government had lost its primacy and sharpness. The second chamber then concerned itself with the solution of practical problems, and Welcker played a valuable role. This was particularly the case as the reporter on the deliberations on the list of punishments and imprisonment laws, and in the discussion of the laws on criminal procedure.

=== Revolutions of 1848 ===
With the events of the French February Revolution, it became clear that a new formation of the relationships between Germany's peoples would become a burning issue. In Baden's second chamber as well as in the independent associations that had come together by March 1848, discussion began of the future form of Germany.

On 14 March 1848, the Baden government had named Welcker as its Bundestag representative. In this capacity, and in his capacity of the National Assembly (Frankfurt Parliament), he now concerned himself with German constitutional questions. Welcker was also assigned diplomatic missions, to Vienna and Olomouc among other places, to discuss conceding concessions to the revolutionaries with the Austrian government, and to Sweden, where he brought along the young Victor von Scheffel as a secretary.

After his diplomatic journeys, he was uncomfortable with the idea of Prussia leading Germany, and for this reason he left the center party he had previously belonged to. He recommended that Austria and Prussia rule in alternation, but this proposal received a minority of votes. In February, 1849, he made a counter proposal for a constitution for the empire, which would have a directorate of seven members under the alternating presidency of the two major powers. The calls for an "indivisible, permanent constitutional hereditary monarchy" in Austria, disappointed Welcker, as he had always considered only an absorption of the German lands of Austria into the new union. He now made a major about-face, and, without informing his own party (Vereinigung des Pariser Hofes), on 12 March in the National Assembly he made the surprising proposal to "accept the entire imperial constitution as it now stands after the first reading before the constitution committee with regard to the wishes for a government, and accept it with a single vote". This proposal was rejected.

The rejection of the Kaiser crown by Frederick William IV of Prussia further disappointed Welcker. During the thirtieth gathering on the imperial constitution, he aimed for a constitution at any price, and always voted with the radicals. When on 26 May 1849, his proposal was turned down to make a proclamation to the people rejecting the mixing of foreigners in German affairs, he left the National Assembly. His decision to also step down from his governmental office protected him from the fate of various political friends after the suppression of the Baden Revolution, who were dismissed although they had nothing to do with the revolution and moreover had fought it strongly.

=== Later activities ===
Aside from his representation of Bretten precinct in the Baden second chamber in 1850, Welcker no longer took official part in public life. In 1841, he moved to Heidelberg, where, in quiet retirement with his family, he worked on his reminiscences and literature. Many of his works came out in new editions, a special example from 1857-66 being a third edition of the constitutional dictionary (German: Staatslexikon; 12 vols., Altona, 1834–44; 3d ed., 14 vols., Leipzig, 1856–66). The significance of this work, which glorified constitutional monarchy, lay essentially in its point of view, and in its presentation which was written for the understanding of the middle class.

In the beginning of the 1860s when liberalism as well as the national ideal received renewed interest, Welcker rejoined the political scene. He promoted unification at the conference of representatives in Weimar in September 1862, at the gathering in Frankfurt, which took place at the same time as the gathering of princes, and in 1866 at the gathering of representatives in Frankfurt. However, times had changed considerably compared to when he had done his earlier work. This may explain why after 1866 he worked against German unity under Prussia's leadership, and adhered to the agitation of the Swabian particularists. By the time Welcker developed a lung inflammation on 2 March 1869, people of younger generations no longer knew of him.
