= Georg Waitz =

German historian

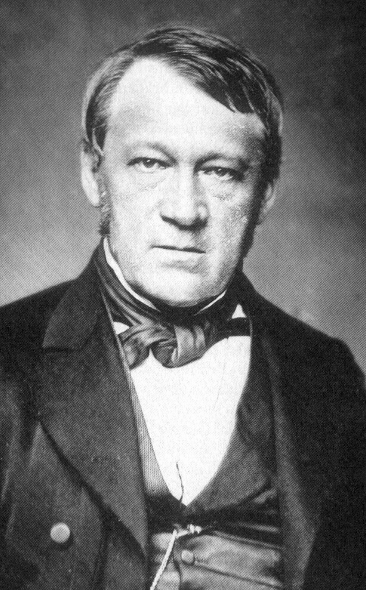
Georg Waitz

Georg Waitz (9 October 1813 – 24 May 1886) was a German medieval historian and politician. Waitz is often spoken of as the leading disciple of Leopold von Ranke, though perhaps he had more affinity with Georg Heinrich Pertz or Friedrich Christoph Dahlmann. He concentrated on medieval German history.

== Biography ==
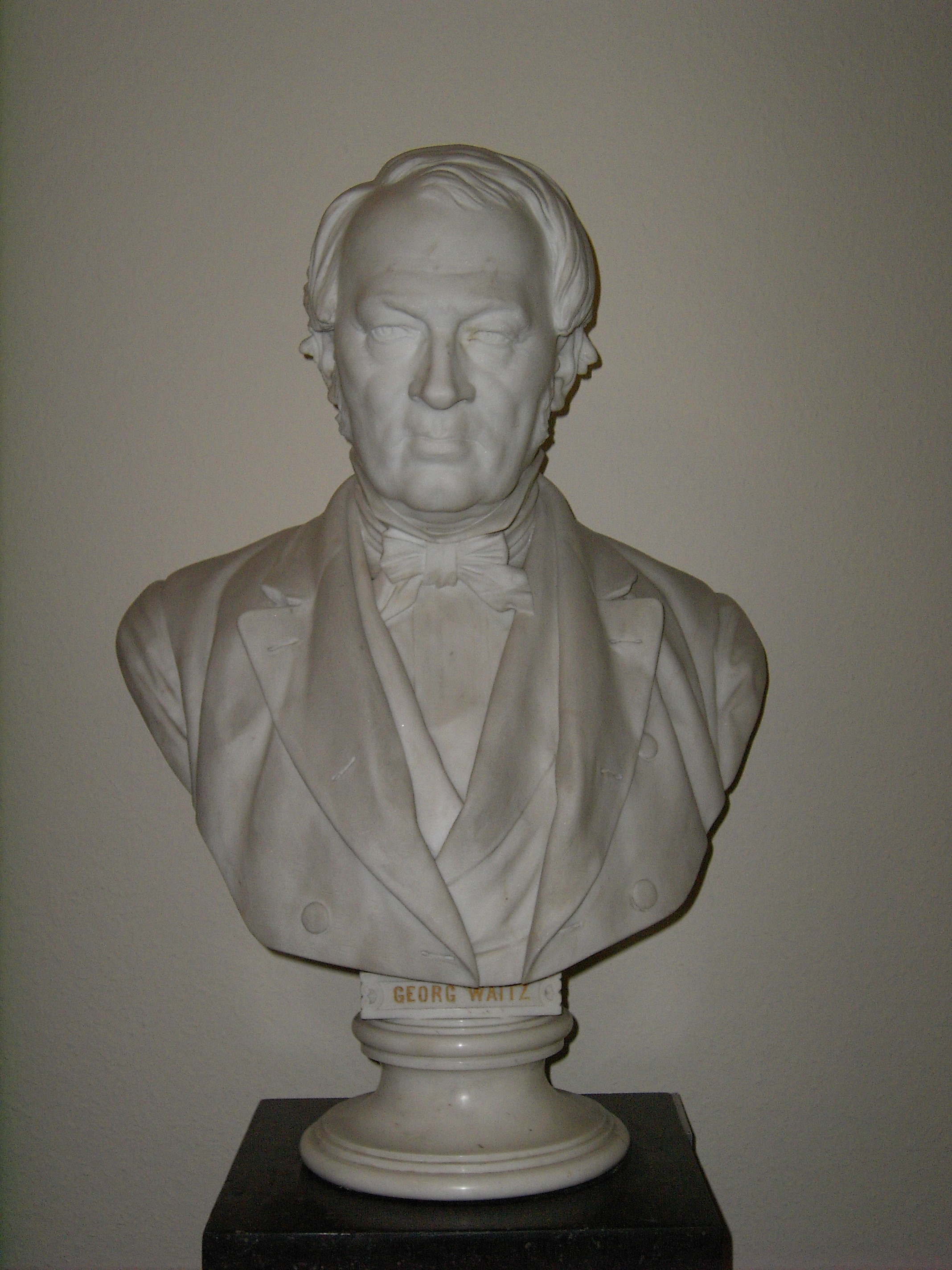
Bust of Georg Waitz

He was born at Flensburg, in the Duchy of Schleswig, and educated at the Flensburg gymnasium and the universities of Kiel and Berlin. The influence of Ranke early diverted him from his original purpose of studying law, and while still a student he began researches in German medieval history, his life's work.

On graduating at Berlin in August 1836, Waitz went to Hanover to assist Pertz in publishing the Monumenta Germaniae Historica; and it led to the chair of history at Kiel in 1842. Waitz began to take an interest in politics, and in 1846 entered the provincial diet as representative of his university. His leanings were strongly German, so that he annoyed the Danish government, and he accepted an invitation in 1847 to become professor of history at the University of Göttingen peculiarly acceptable.

The Revolutions of 1848 delayed Waitz in taking up his new chair. When the German party in Schleswig and the duchy of Holstein rose against the Danish government during the First Schleswig War, Waitz placed himself at the service of the provisional government. He was sent to Berlin to represent the interests of the duchies there, and during his absence he was elected by Kiel as a delegate to the Frankfurt Parliament. He was supported German unification; and when King Frederick William IV of Prussia declined the imperial crown Waitz withdrew from the assembly in disappointment, and left public life.

In the autumn of 1849 Waitz began lecturing at Göttingen, and the reputation of the Göttingen historical school grew. In 1875 he moved to Berlin to succeed Pertz as principal editor of the Monumenta Germaniae historica. He travelled to England, France and Italy to collate works preserved there. He died at Berlin on 24 May 1886. He was twice married—in 1842 to a daughter of Friedrich Wilhelm Joseph von Schelling the philosopher, and in 1858 to a daughter of Jakob von Hartmann.

The violinist Joseph Joachim attended Waitz's lectures in 1853.

== Works ==
Waitz's main works, apart from his contributions to the Monumenta, are:

- Deutsche Verfassungsgeschichte (8 vols, Kiel, 1844–1878; 2nd ed., 2 vols only, 1865–1870)
- Schleswig-Holsteins Geschichte (2 vols, Göttingen, 1851–1854; the 3rd vol. was never published)
- Lübeck unter Jürgen Wullenwever und die europäische Politik (3 vols; Berlin, 1855–1856)
- Grundzüge der Politik (Kiel, 1862)

Other works include:

- Jahrbücher des deutschen Reichs unter Heinrich I. (Berlin, 1837, 3rd ed., 1885)
- Über das Leben und die Lehre des Ulfila (Hanover, 1840)
- Das alte Recht der salischen Franken (Kiel, 1846)
- Deutsche Kaiser von Karl dem Grossen bis Maximilian (Berlin, 1872)

With other scholars, Waitz took a leading part in the publication of the Forschungen zur deutschen Geschichte (Munich, 1862 seq.), and in the Nordalbingische Studien, published in the Proceedings of the Schleswig-Holstein Historical Society (Kiel, 1844–1851). A Bibliographische Übersicht über Waitz's Werke was published by Ernst Steindorff at Göttingen in 1886.

Obituary notices of Waitz are in the Historische Zeitschrift, new series, vol. xx.; in the publications for 1886 of the Berlin Academie der Wissenschaften, the Göttingen Gesellschaft der Wissenschaften, and the Hansischer Geschichtsverein; in the Historisches Jahrbuch der Görres Gesellschaft, vol. viii.; and in the Revue historique, vol. xxxi.
