= Johann Gustav Droysen =

German historian (1808–1884)

Gustav Droysen
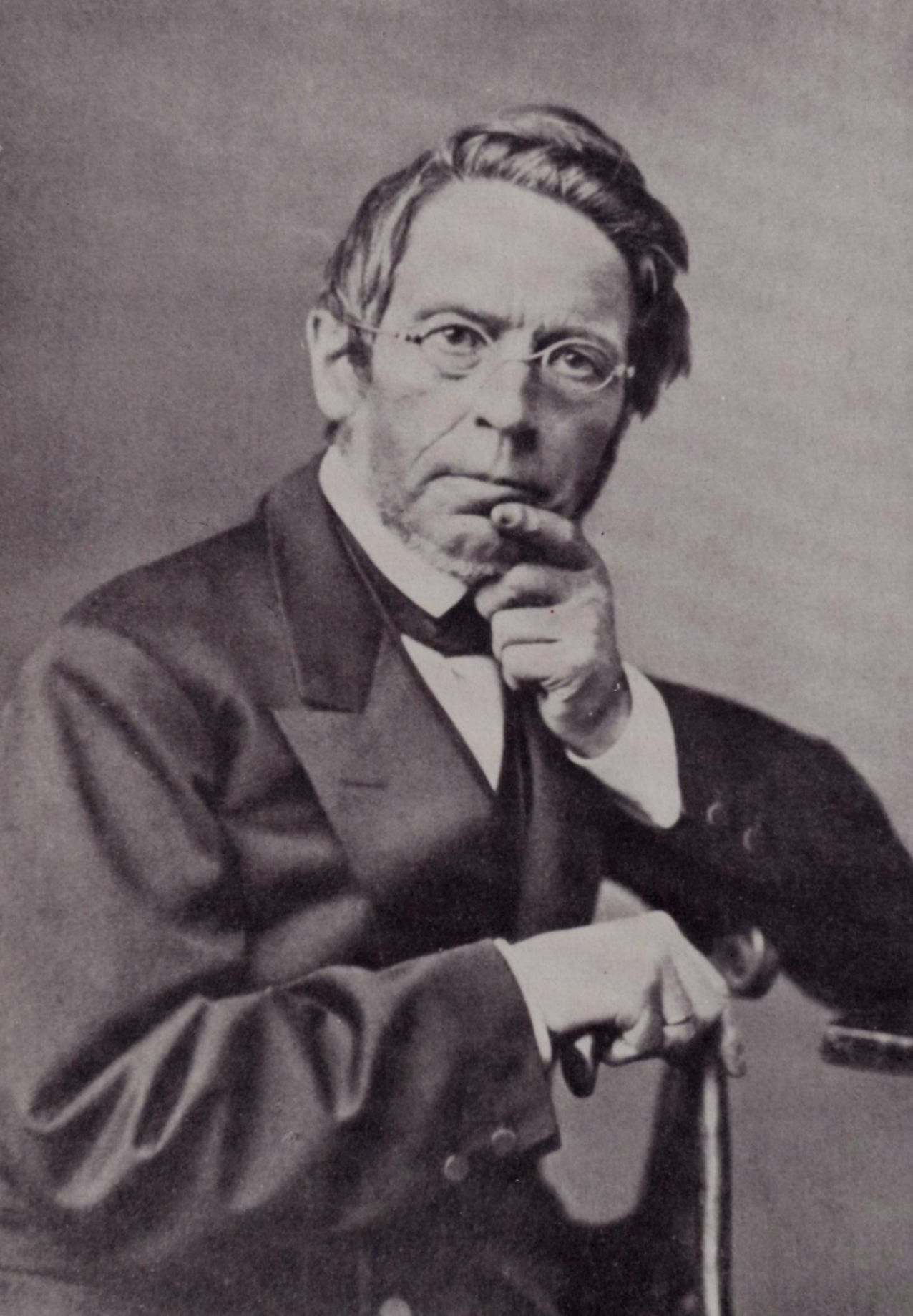
- Born: 6 July 1808; Treptow, Pomerania, Kingdom of Prussia (now Poland)
- Died: 19 June 1884 (aged 75); Berlin, Brandenburg, German Empire

Education
- Education: University of Berlin (PhD, 1831)
- Thesis: De Lagidarum regno Ptolemaeo IV Philometore rege (1831)
- Academic advisor: August Böckh

Philosophical work
- Era: 19th-century philosophy
- Region: Western philosophy
- School: Historism
- Institutions: University of Berlin; University of Kiel; University of Jena
- Main interests: Historical method
- Notable ideas: The erkennen–erklären–verstehen distinction

Johann Gustav Bernhard Droysen (/ˈdrɔɪzən/; German: [ˈdʁɔʏzn̩]; 6 July 1808 – 19 June 1884) was a German historian. His history of Alexander the Great was the first work representing a new school of German historical thought that idealized power held by so-called "great" men.

== Early life and education ==
Droysen was born at Treptow in Pomerania (now Trzebiatów in Poland) on 6 July 1808. His father, Johann Christoph Droysen, was an army chaplain who had been present at the celebrated siege of Kolberg in 1806–1807. As a child, Droysen witnessed some of the military operations during the War of Liberation, his father by then being pastor at Greifenhagen, in the immediate neighbourhood of Stettin, which was held by the French for most of 1813. These youthful impressions laid the foundation of his ardent attachment to the Kingdom of Prussia. He was educated at the gymnasium of Stettin and at the University of Berlin; from 1827 to 1829 he was the private tutor of Felix Mendelssohn, who set several of his poems in his Op. 9 12 Songs. In 1829 he became a master at the Graues Kloster, one of the oldest schools in Berlin; in addition, he gave lectures at the University of Berlin, from 1833 as Privatdozent, and from 1835 as professor, without a salary. The famed historian Jacob Burckhardt visited his class in his last semester (1839–40).

During these years Droysen studied classical antiquity; he published a translation of Aeschylus in 1832 and a paraphrase of Aristophanes (1835–1838), but the work by which he made himself known as a historian was his Geschichte Alexanders des Grossen (History of Alexander the Great; Berlin, 1833 and other editions), a book that long remained the best work on Alexander the Great. It was in some ways the herald of a new school of German historical thought, for it idealized power and success, a conceptual framework Droysen had learned from the teaching of Hegel. Droysen followed the biography of Alexander with other works dealing with Alexander's Greek successors, published under the title of Geschichte des Hellenismus (Hamburg, 1836–1843), in which he created the term "Hellenistic" to refer to the period between Alexander's conquests and the emergence of the Roman Empire. A new and revised edition of the whole work was published in 1885, and translated into French, but not at the time into English. His Vorlesung des Freiheits Krieg (in English: Lectures of the War of Liberation) appeared in 1846 and his Outlines of the Principles of History, published 1858, translated 1893, was widely read throughout German universities. He followed this with Erhebung der Geschichte zum Rang einer Wissenschaft (1863), a methodological study that reflected his new approach to research and writing.

== History meets politics ==
In 1840, Droysen was appointed professor of history at the University of Kiel. There, the political movement for the defense of the rights of the Elbe duchies, of which Kiel was the center, attracted his interest. Like Friedrich Christoph Dahlmann, he placed his historical learning at the service of the estates of Schleswig and Holstein and composed the address of 1844, in which the estates protested against the claim of King Christian VIII of Denmark to alter the law of succession in the duchies. The issue was diplomatically negotiated through the London Protocol of 1852, and ultimately resolved in a war between Denmark and allied forces from Austria and Prussia in the Second Schleswig War.

== Support of Prussian hegemony ==
In 1848, Droysen was elected a member of the revolutionary Frankfurt parliament and acted as secretary to the committee for drawing up a proposed constitution. He was a determined supporter of Prussian ascendancy, seeing this as the only feasible route to German unification.

We cannot conceal the fact that the whole German question is a simple alternative between Prussia and Austria. In these states, German life has its positive and negative poles — in the former, all the interests which are national and reformative, in the latter, all that are dynastic and destructive. The German question is not a constitutional question, but a question of power; and the Prussian monarchy is now wholly German, while that of Austria cannot be.

Droysen was one of the first members to retire from the Frankfurt Parliament after King Frederick William IV of Prussia refused the imperial crown in 1849. In the following two years, Droysen continued to support the cause of the duchies, and in 1850, with Carl Samwer, he published a history of the dealings of Denmark with Schleswig and Holstein, Die Herzogthümer Schleswig-Holstein und das Königreich Dänemark seit dem Jahre 1800 (Hamburg, 1850). A translation was published in London in the same year under the title The Policy of Denmark towards the Duchies of Schleswig-Holstein. The work was one of great political importance and contributed to the formation of German public opinion on the rights of the duchies in their struggle with Denmark.

== Legacy to Prussian historiography ==
In his later years, Droysen was almost entirely occupied with Prussian history. After 1851, he was appointed to a professorship at Jena; in 1859, he was called to Berlin, where he remained until his death. In 1851, he brought out a life of Count Yorck von Wartenburg (Berlin, 1851–1852), generally considered one of the best biographies in the German language and then began his great work on the Geschichte der preussischen Politik, or, in English, The History of Prussian Politics (Berlin, 1855–1886). Seven volumes were published, the last posthumously; in total the work consumed 32 volumes. It forms a complete history of the growth of the Prussian monarchy to the year 1756. This, like all Droysen's work, shows a strongly marked individuality, and a penchant of tracing the manner in which important dynamic forces worked themselves out in history. In 1931, Felix Gilbert wrote his doctoral dissertation on the subject of “Johann Gustav Droysen and the Prussian-German Question” under the supervision of eminent German professor Friedrich Meinecke.

== Personal life ==
Droysen was twice married and died in Berlin. His eldest son, Gustav, wrote several well-known historical works, namely, Gustav Adolf (Leipzig, 1869–1870), a study of the Gustavus Adolphus, the King of Sweden during the Thirty Years' War, and Herzog Bernhard von Weimar (Leipzig, 1885), a study of Duke Bernhard, another able Protestant General during the Thirty Years' War; an Historischer Handatlas (Leipzig, 1886), a geographic analysis of historical and territorial changes, and several writings on various events of the Thirty Years' War. Another son, Hans Droysen, was the author of some works on Greek history and antiquities.

== See also ==
- Hermeneutics
- Verstehen
