= Friedrich Christoph Dahlmann =

German historian and politician

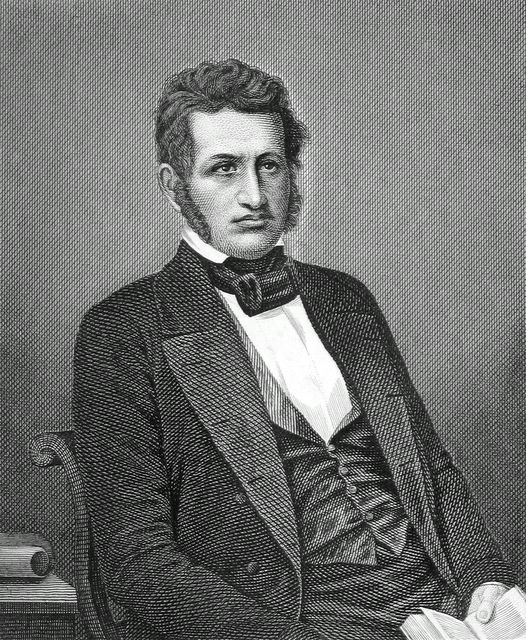
Friedrich Christoph Dahlmann

Friedrich Christoph Dahlmann (13 May 1785, Wismar – 5 December 1860, Bonn) was a German historian and politician.

== Career ==
He came of an old Hanseatic family of Wismar, then controlled by Sweden. His father, who was burgomaster of the town, intended him to study theology, but Friedrich preferred classical philology, which he studied from 1802 to 1806 at the University of Copenhagen, University of Halle, and then again at Copenhagen. After finishing his studies, he translated some of the Greek tragic poets, and The Clouds of Aristophanes. But he was also interested in modern literature and philosophy; and the troubles of the times, of which he had personal experience, aroused in him a strong feeling of German patriotism, though throughout his life he was always proud of his connection with Scandinavia, and Gustavus Adolphus was his particular hero.

In 1809, on the outbreak of war in Austria, Dahlmann, together with the poet Heinrich von Kleist, whom he had met in Dresden, went to Bohemia, and was afterwards with the Imperial army, up till the Battle of Aspern, with the somewhat vague object of trying to convert the Austrian war into a German one. This hope was shattered by the defeat of Wagram.

He now decided to try his fortunes in Denmark, where he had influential relations. After taking his doctor's degree at the University of Wittenberg in 1810 he qualified at Copenhagen in 1811, with an essay on the origins of the ancient theatre, as a lecturer on ancient literature and history, on which he delivered lectures in Latin. His influential friends soon brought him further advancement. As early as 1812 he was summoned to Kiel, as successor to the historian Dietrich Hermann Hegewisch (1746–1812). This appointment proved in two respects a decisive moment in his career; on the one hand it made him give his whole attention to a subject for which he was admirably suited, but to which he had so far given only a secondary interest; and on the other hand, it threw him into politics.

In 1815 he obtained, in addition to his professorate, the position of secretary to the perpetual deputation of the estates of Schleswig-Holstein. In this capacity he began, by means of memoirs or of articles in the Kieler Blätter, which he founded himself, to appear as an able and zealous champion of the half-forgotten rights of the Elbe duchies, as against Denmark, and of their close connexion with Germany. It was he upon whom the Danes afterwards threw the blame of having invented the Schleswig-Holstein question; certainly his activities form an important link in the chain of events which eventually led to the solution of 1864. So far as this interest affected himself, the chief profit lay in the fact that it deepened his conception of the state, and directed it to more practical ends. Whereas at that time mere speculation dominated both the French Liberalism of the school of Rotteck, and Karl Ludwig von Haller's Romanticist doctrine of the Christian state, Dahlmann took as his premises the circumstances as he found them, and evolved the new out of the old by a quiet process of development. Moreover, in the inevitable conflict with the Danish crown his upright point of view and his German patriotism were further confirmed.

After transferring to the University of Göttingen around 1829 he had the opportunity of working in the same spirit. As confidant of the duke of Cambridge, he was allowed to take a share in framing the Hanoverian constitution of 1833, which remodelled the old aristocratic government in a direction which had become inevitable since the July revolution in Paris. When in 1837 the new king Ernst August declared the constitution invalid, Dahlmann inspired the famous protest of the seven professors of Göttingen. Though deprived of his position and banished, he had the satisfaction of knowing that German national feeling received a boost from his courageous action, while public subscriptions saved him from poverty.

After several years in Leipzig and Jena, King Frederick William IV of Prussia appointed him in October 1842 to a professorship at the University of Bonn. The years that followed were those of his greatest fame. His Politik (1835) had already made him a name as a writer. He now published his Dänische Geschichte (1840-1843), a historical work of the first rank. This publication was soon followed by histories of the English Revolution and the French Revolution. These histories, though of less scientific value, exercised a decisive influence upon public opinion by their open advocacy of the system of constitutional monarchy. As a teacher too he was much beloved. Though no orator, and in spite of a personality not particularly amiable or winning, he produced a profound impression upon young men by the pregnancy of his expression, a consistent logical method of thought based on Immanuel Kant and by the manliness of his character.

When the revolution of 1848 broke out, the "father of German nationality", as the provisional government at Milan called him, found himself the centre of universal interest. Both Mecklenburg and Prussia offered him in vain the post of envoy to the diet of the confederation. Naturally, too, he was elected to the national assembly at Frankfurt, and took a leading part in the constitutional committees appointed first by the diet, then by the parliament. His objective was to make Germany as far as possible a united constitutional monarchy, with the exclusion of the whole of Austria, or at least, of its non-German parts. Prussia was to provide the emperor, but at the same time, exposing the doctrinaire weakness of the system, was to give up its separate existence, consecrated by history, in the same way as the other states. When, therefore, Frederick William IV, without showing any anxiety to bind himself by the conditions laid down at Frankfurt, concluded with Denmark the seven months Armistice of Malmö agreed on 26 August 1848, Dahlmann proposed that the national parliament should refuse to recognize the truce, with the express intention of clearing up once for all the relations of the parliament with the court of Berlin. The motion was passed by a small majority on 5 September 1848 but the members of Dahlmann's party were just those who voted against it, and it was they who on 18 September reversed the previous vote and passed a resolution accepting the truce, after Dahlmann had failed to form a ministry on the basis of the 5 September resolution, owing to his objection to the Radicals.

Dahlmann afterwards described this as the decisive turning-point in the fate of the parliament. He did not immediately give up hope. Though he took little active part in parliamentary debates, he was very active on commissions and in party conferences, and it was largely owing to him that a German constitution was at last evolved, and that Frederick William IV was elected hereditary emperor on 28 March 1849. He was accordingly one of the deputation which offered the crown to the king in Berlin. The king's refusal came as less of a surprise to him than to most of his colleagues. He counted on being able to compel recognition of the constitution by the moral pressure of the consent of the people. It was only when the attitude of the Radicals made it clear to him that this course would lead to a revolution, that he decided, after a long struggle, to retire from the national parliament on 21 May 1849.

He remained one of the chief promoters of the well-known conference of the imperial party at Gotha, the proceedings of which were not, however, satisfactory to him. He took part in the sessions of the first Prussian chamber 1849-1850 and of the parliament of Erfurt 1850. But finally, convinced that for the moment all efforts towards the unity of Germany were unavailing, he retired from political life, though often pressed to stand for election, and again took up his work of teaching at Bonn. His last years were, however, saddened by illness, bereavement and continual friction with his colleagues. His death followed an apoplectic fit.

== Publications ==
Dahkmann's chief works included:

- Quellenkunde der deutschen Geschichte nach der Folge der Begebenheiten geordnet. 1830.
  - 7th edition of Dahlmann-Waitz, Quellenkunde, Leipzig, 1906
- Politik, auf den Grund und das Mass der gegebenen Zustände zurückgeführt (1 vol., 1835)
- Geschichte Dänemarks (3 vols., 1840–1843)
- Geschichte der englischen Revolution (1844)
- Geschichte der französischen Revolution (1845).
