= Prussian Naval Ministry =

Prussian government ministry

The Prussian Ministry of the Navy (Marineministerium) (1861 to 1871) grew out of that established by the Frankfurt National Assembly (1848–1849) for its ‘Imperial Fleet' Reichsflotte. From 1866 it served additionally as the Navy Department of the North German Confederation.

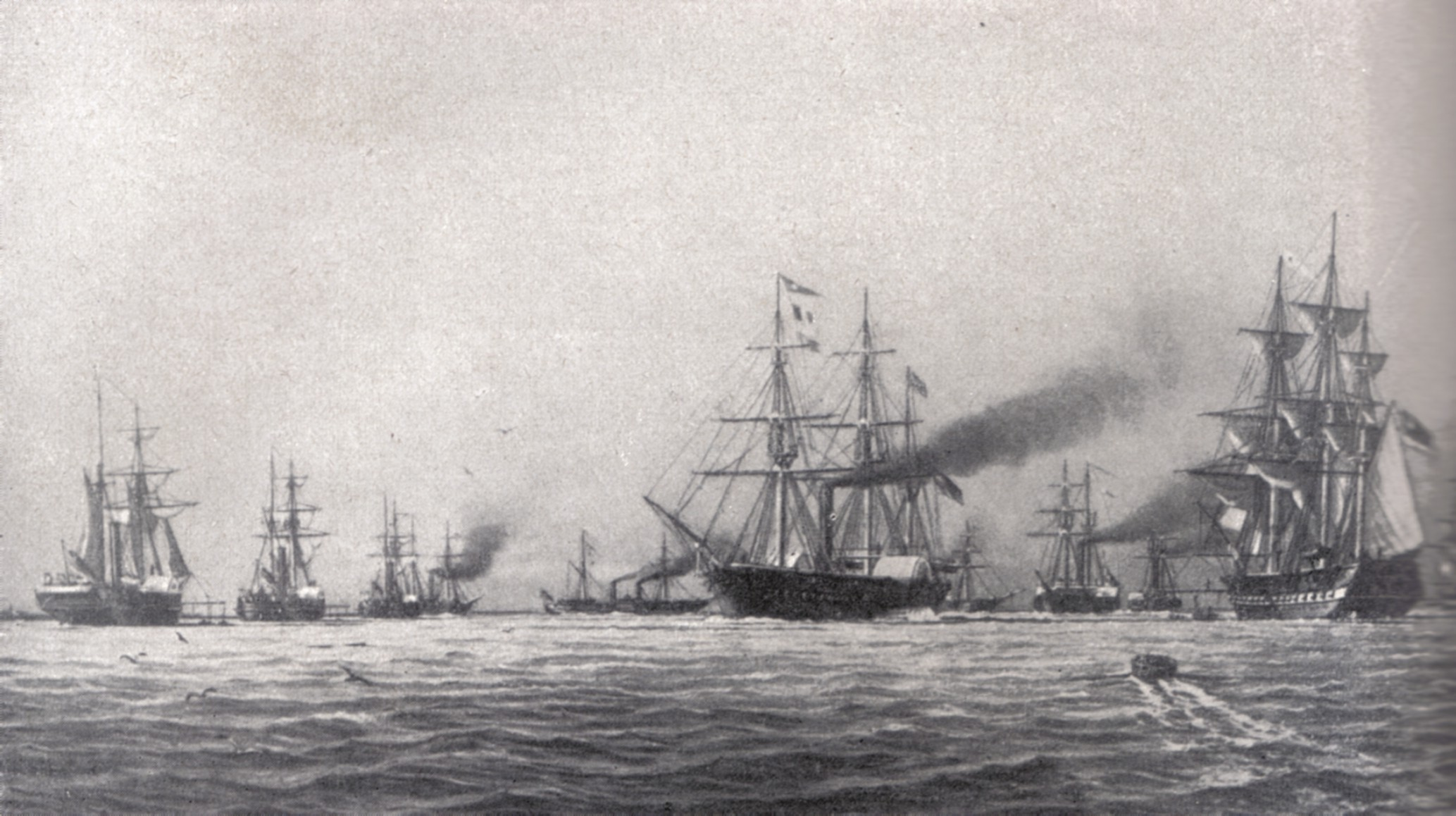
The Reichsflotte 1849

In June, 1848 the Frankfurt National Assembly created the first Navy Department with businessman Arnold Duckwitz as Minister for Navy Affairs (Minister für Marineangelegenheiten). After the closure of the Frankfurt National Assembly in May 1849, Austrian Lieutenant Fieldmarshal August von Jochmus became Navy Minister of the revived German Confederation. With the end of the Provisional Central Power (Provisorische Zentralgewalt) of the Frankfurt National Assembly in December 1849, the first Naval Department dissolved and authority in naval matters again came under the sovereignty of individual members of the German Confederation. A Royal Naval Division (Königliche Marine-Abteilung ) was established in Berlin, as a department of the Prussian Minister of War, with Lieutenant Colonel von Wangenheim Bogun as head in the years 1848–1853. He administered the Prussian Navy under the Naval High Command (Oberkommando der Marine). Then, on 14 November 1853 by a Prussian royal cabinet order (König Kabinettsordre) the Naval Division was combined into an Admiralty Council (Admiralität), which would provide united command and administrative authority. From 1859 to 1860 Admiral Jan Schröder was chief of the Prussian Navy administration (Marineverwaltung).

In 1861 the Prussian government created a new Navy Department (Marineministerium). After Wilhelm I became King of Prussia the Admiralty of the Prussian Navy was on 16 April 1861 dissolved by cabinet order. The Naval High Command under Prince Adalbert of Prussia became independently and directly subordinate to the king. After the retirement of Admiral Jan Schröder the administration of the navy was under the new Navy Department (Marineministerium), which was under Prussian War Minister Albrecht von Roon until 1873. The Admiralty Council (Admiralitätsrat) was to co-ordinate naval affairs of the Navy Department and the Naval High Command, but could only make proposals.

The Navy Department was responsible for the Danzig (today Gdansk) shipyard, the depots in Geestemünde (today Bremerhaven), Kiel and Stralsund, the admiralty commissary (Admiralitätskommissariat) in Oldenburg and the base at Jade Bight (today Wilhelmshaven). The Naval High Command was responsible for the fleet. This dual organization did not work well. There was much unfruitful work and friction between the two organizations.

A possibility for change arose with the outbreak the Franco-Prussian War in 1870 when Prince Adalbert was transferred to army field command. By cabinet order the tasks of the Naval High Command were on 29 June 1870 transferred to the Navy Department. Next, departments for technical and general administrative affairs was formed. The existing division of powers was abolished and a central authority created. The departmental friction disappeared almost completely.

Due to the great increase in the duties of the Prussian War Minister, Wilhelm I on 30 November 1871 moved the Navy Department from the War Ministry to a newly created admiralty, which in a few months would become the German Imperial Admiralty.
