= German naval history =

The German navy has operated under different names. See

- Prussian Navy, 1701–1867
- Reichsflotte (Fleet of the Realm), 1848–52
- North German Federal Navy, 1867–71
- Imperial German Navy (" Kaiserliche Marine"), 1871–1919
- Reichsmarine, 1919–35
- Kriegsmarine, 1935–45
- German Mine Sweeping Administration, 1945 to 1956
- German Navy, since 1956
- Volksmarine the navy of East Germany, 1956–91

== See also ==
- German Navy (disambiguation)
