= Battle of Heligoland (1849) =

Naval battle of the First Schleswig War

- Part of the First War of Schleswig
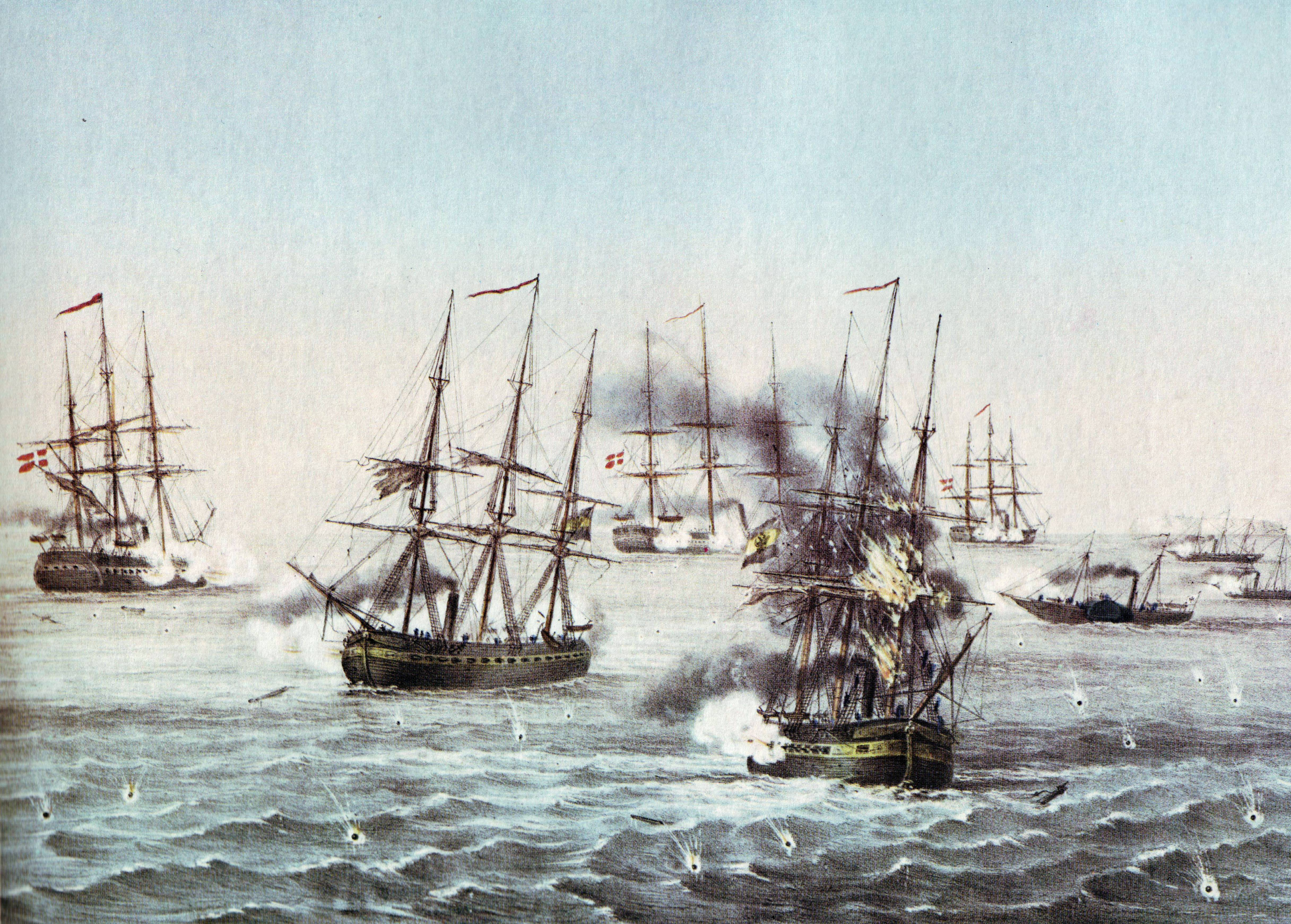
- Gefecht bei Helgoland, unknown author
Date	4 June 1849
Location	Off Heligoland, German Bight
Result	Inconclusive

Belligerents
Denmark	German Confederation

Commanders and leaders
(Denmark) Andreas Polder	(German Confederation) Karl Rudolf Brommy

Strength
1 sail corvette 2 sail frigates 1 steamer	1 steam frigate 2 steam corvettes

Casualties and losses
None	None

The first Battle of Heligoland took place on 4 June 1849 during the First Schleswig War and pitted the fledgling Reichsflotte (Imperial Fleet) against the Royal Danish Navy, which had blocked German naval trade in North Sea and Baltic Sea since early 1848. The outcome was inconclusive, with no casualties, and the blockade went on. It remained the only battle of the German fleet.

== Background ==
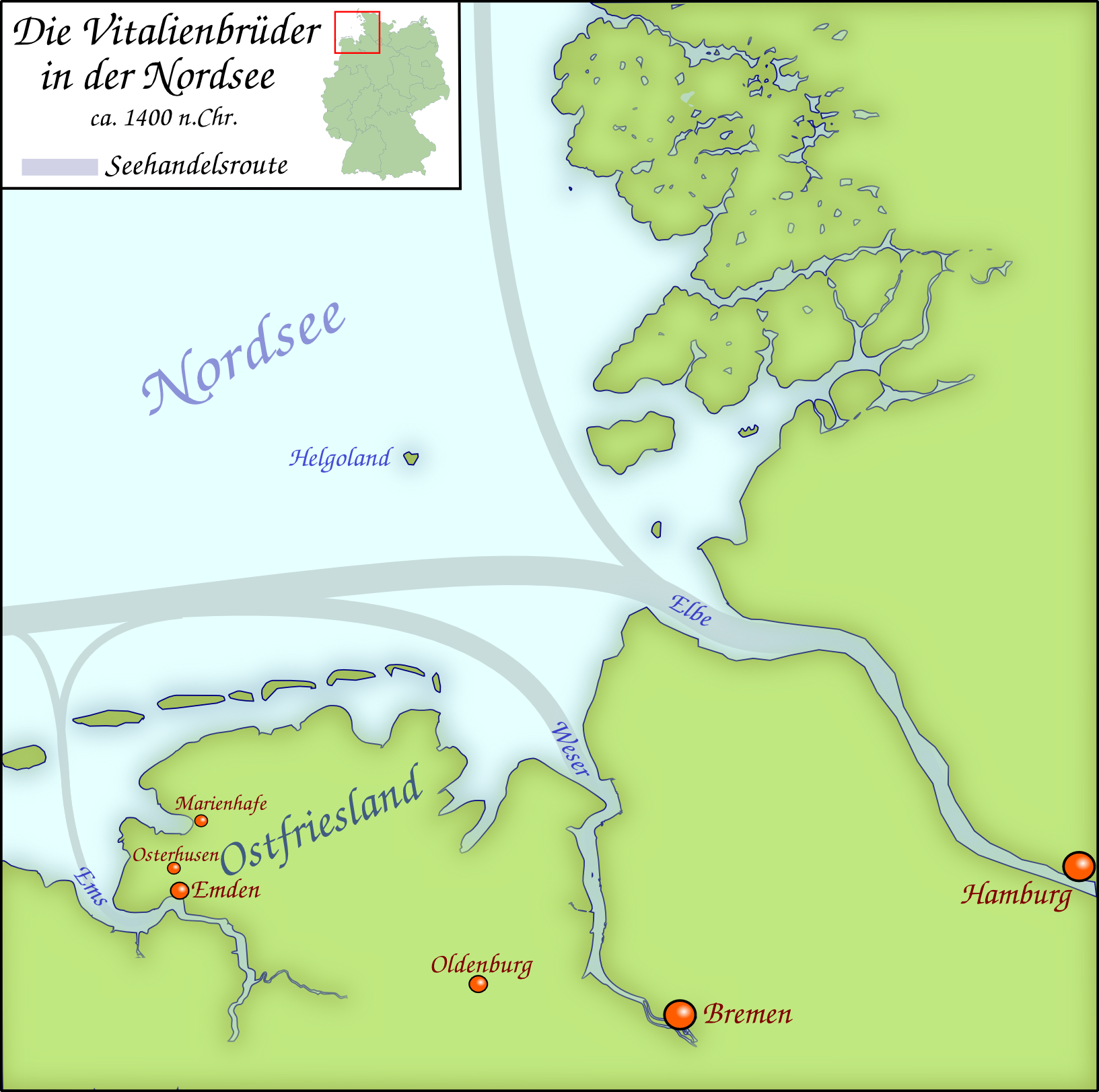
The German Bight with Helgoland and the traditional trading routes

The Duchies of Schleswig, Holstein and Lauenburg were possessions of the Danish crown, but were not formally included in Denmark-proper; Holstein was simultaneously part of the German Confederation, and Schleswig also had a sizeable German population. In January 1848, King Frederick VII of Denmark announced that the duchies would be formally merged into Denmark, which led to the start of the First Schleswig War. The Royal Danish Navy quickly imposed a blockade of the coasts of the various German states in the North Sea and Baltic Sea. The outbreak of the Revolutions of 1848 across Europe in February complicated matters; the newly created Frankfurt Parliament sought to unify the German states into a single country.

To combat the Danish blockade, the Frankfurt Parliament set about organizing a navy, and at the same time, several of the German states began their own naval projects, including the creation of the Schleswig–Holstein Navy, the recreation of the Prussian Navy and the establishment of a squadron of four armed vessels by Hamburg, among others. By late 1848, the Parliament had succeeded in creating the Reichsflotte (Imperial Fleet), and by early the next year, a fleet of 27 warships of varying sizes had been assembled; most of these were small, sailing gunboats. The fleet was placed under the command of Captain Karl Rudolf Brommy. The core of the German fleet, a group of eight paddle steamers, was based at Bremerhaven on the North Sea coast.

By this time, the fighting with Denmark had ended temporarily with the armistice of Malmö, though the agreement was set to expire in March 1849. Upon the resumption of fighting, the Danish fleet once again applied a blockade of the German coasts. On 5 April, a pair of Danish ships attacked the Schlwesig port of Eckernförde in the Battle of Eckernförde, which saw one of the ships destroyed and the other captured. By the summer of 1849, Brommy had only three serviceable ships available to him: the paddle frigate Barbarossa and the paddle corvettes Lübeck and Hamburg; the remainder were out of service for one reason or another. The paddle corvette Bremen was undergoing repairs to her boilers, and Erzherzog Johann had been damaged and was not seaworthy. Shortages of trained crewmen compounded the Germans' warhip troubles.

By early 1849, the Danish squadron enforcing the blockade of the German coast in the North Sea consisted of the sail frigates HDMS Rota, Bellona, and Thetis and the sail corvette Valkyrien. The ships were commanded by Captain Andreas Polder. In May, the squadron was reinforced with the steamer Gejser, which had been sent to intercept British vessels that stopped in the protected waters of British-controlled Heligoland before attempting to dash into Hamburg when the sail-powered warships were unable to catch them.

== Battle ==
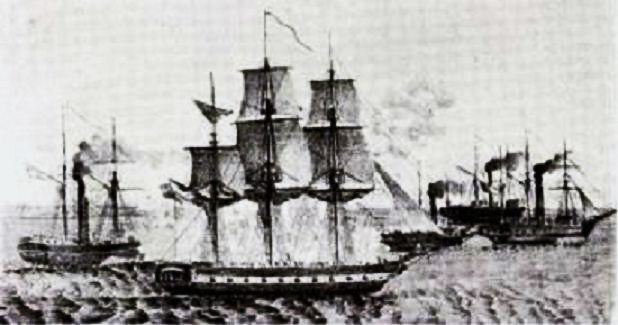
The Danish corvettes Gejser and Valkyrien being pursued by ships of the Schleswig-Holstein Navy

On 4 June 1849, Brommy sortied with his three active ships, Barbarossa serving as his flagship, to attack the Danish ships stationed off the mouth of the Weser river. The Danish sail corvette Valkyrien was stationed to the east of the island of Heligoland, and Brommy moved to engage her at around mid-day. The two sides exchanged heavy fire, but neither inflicted damage on the other. The Danish ships quickly withdrew, but the slower Valkyrien could not keep pace with the other ships, and Brommy's flotilla moved to cut her off from the other vessels.

In an attempt to avoid destruction, Valkyrien turned for the coastal waters of the island of Heligoland, then part of Great Britain, as the Germans would not be able to pursue the ship without violating British neutrality. After Valkyrien entered the 3 nautical miles (5.6 km; 3.5 mi) limit marking British territorial waters, British coastal artillery gunners fired a warning shot to dissuade further action by Brommy's ships. Britain refused to recognize the Frankfurt Parliament or its navy, and the foreign secretary, Lord Palmerston, went so far as to refer to the German fleet as pirates.

Brommy initially remained outside of Heligoland's waters, hoping to catch Valkyrien if it left the safety of British neutrality. but by around 14:30, three Danish warships—the frigates Rota and Thetis and the steamer Gejser—approached the area to come to Valkyrien's aid. The appearance of the three Danish warships prompted the Germans to withdraw back to port. The Danish ships pursued him, and at around 16:45, Gejser and Valkyrien opened fire on the retreating Germans. Rota and Thetis moved to block the Germans' path back to the Weser, forcing them to divert to the mouth of the Elbe. After Brommy entered the Elbe and arrived at the port of Cuxhaven, the Danish ships laid off the river entrance to prevent him from making another attack on the blockade force. The Danes thereafter reimposed the blockade of the North Sea coast.

Ships present in the battle

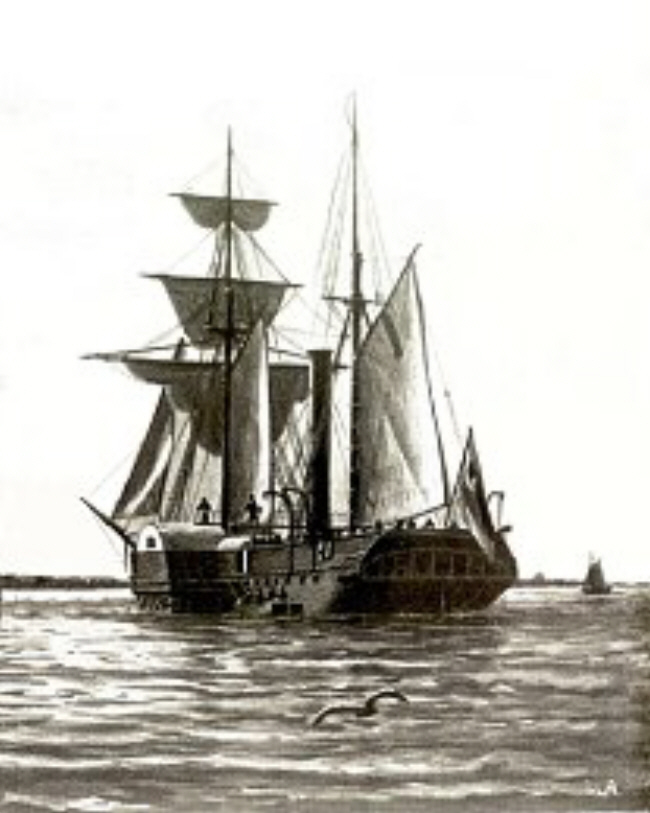
The German corvette Hamburg

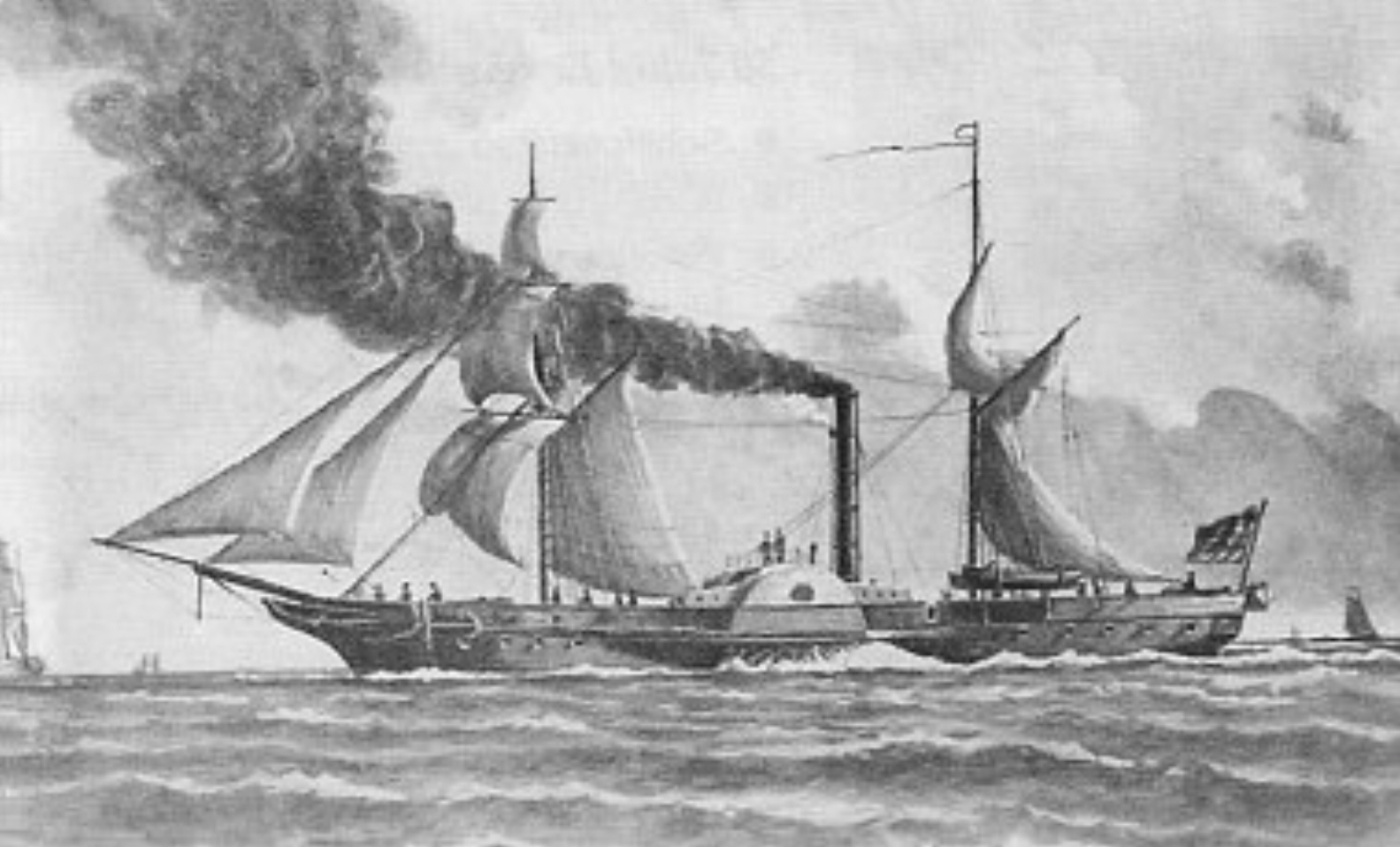
The German corvette Lübeck

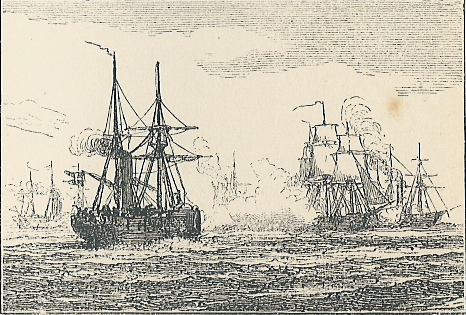
The Danish Corvette Valkyrien fighting with Schleswig-Holstein ships in 1849

== Aftermath ==
Fearing further incidents that might provoke the British government, the Frankfurt Parliament ordered Brommy to remain in port for the rest of the conflict. But before he received these instructions, Brommy sortied again on 14 June with the same three ships in another attempt to break the Danish blockade. This time, he steamed to attack the paddle steamer Hekla and a pair of sail frigates off the Elbe. The battle of Heligoland and the action off the Elbe were the only two operations waged by the Reichsflotte. Brommy thereafter took his ships back to Bremerhaven. The Danes sought to lure out the German warships to eliminate the threat posed to their blockade squadron, including an attempt by Gejser to steam into the Weser, which prompted Barbarossa and another vessel to pursue the Danish ship. When the Germans spotted Rota and Belona in the distance, they broke off the pursuit.

Not long after Brommy's second sortie, the Frankfurt Parliament collapsed and the navy accordingly fell into disarray due to power struggles between Austria and Prussia. Another armistice followed on 19 July, and in July 1850, the Treaty of Berlin ended the fighting between Denmark and the German states. Despite the inconclusive nature of the battle, the action off Heligoland was cited by future naval proponents in the Imperial Germany period as an example of Britain's untrustworthy nature.
