= SMS Gefion (1843) =

Prussian warship

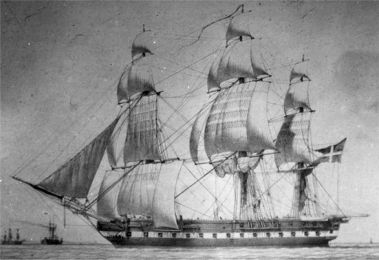
- Gefion as originally built, 1843

History

Denmark
- Name: Gefion
- Namesake: Gefjon
- Laid down: 1841
- Launched: 27 September 1843
- Captured: 5 April 1849
- Fate: Captured during the Battle of Eckernförde, 1845

History

Prussia
- Name: Eckernförde
- Acquired: 5 April 1849
- Renamed: Gefion, 1852
- Stricken: 5 April 1880
- Fate: Scrapped, 1891

General characteristics (as built)
- Type: Frigate
- Displacement: 2,706 t (2,663 long tons)
- Length: 59 m (193 ft 7 in)
- Beam: 13.5 m (44 ft 3 in)
- Draft: 5.6 m (18 ft 4 in)
- Sail plan: Full-rigged
- Speed: 15 kn (28 km/h)
- Armament: 48 × 24-pounder guns

SMS Gefion was a sailing frigate, originally serving the Danish Navy. In 1849, during the First Schleswig War, she fell into the hands of Schleswig-Holstein under the name of Eckernförde. The ship joined the Reichsflotte in 1850. When the Reichsflotte was dissolved in April 1852, Prussia bought her for its navy and her old name was restored.

== Operational history ==
=== Danish service ===
Gefion was commissioned on 6 May 1844. On her first voyage, starting on 23 May, she took the crown prince, the future Frederick VII of Denmark, to the Faroe Islands, then went to the Mediterranean and Morocco, finally taking on board works of art by the late sculptor Bertel Thorvaldsen in Livorno. On November 16, she arrived back in Copenhagen with them. In 1846, again with the crown prince on board, she visited Funchal and Cádiz.

In mid-May 1848, Gefion was equipped for the Schleswig-Holstein War. Until the end of October 1848, she and other ships blockaded the mouth of the Elbe. After the armistice expired in 1849, she was part of the Danish fleet (7 ships with 147 guns together) that was to fight down the beach batteries (three batteries with 16 guns together) at Eckernförde.

In the engagement at Eckernförde on 5 April 1849, the shelling of the coastal batteries at Eckernförde succeeded in forcing the frigate's crew to surrender. She had commenced the attack at about 7:00 in the morning, but due to unfavorable wind conditions was only maneuverable with towing assistance from the steamer Geiser. At about 8:00, the towing cables were cut by shelling. All further attempts to tow the ship failed due to the shelling. Anchored near the beach, the ship was unable to leave the bay again due to the unfavorable wind under fire and surrendered at about 6:00 in the evening. After the abandonment of the heavily damaged frigate, the ship was initially taken under the then neutral Prussian flag until the question of ownership was finally clarified, but had already been renamed SMS Eckernförde. On September 12, 1850, the Danes attempted to recapture ger, which had been repaired in Eckernförde harbor. When this failed, an attempt was made to destroy her by setting her on fire. The ship would have been lost had the crew obeyed the order of the English captain and abandoned the ship. However, First Officer Thaulow and Second Officer Neynaber refused the order to abandon ship and were able to save the ship with the support of the entire crew.

=== Prussian service ===
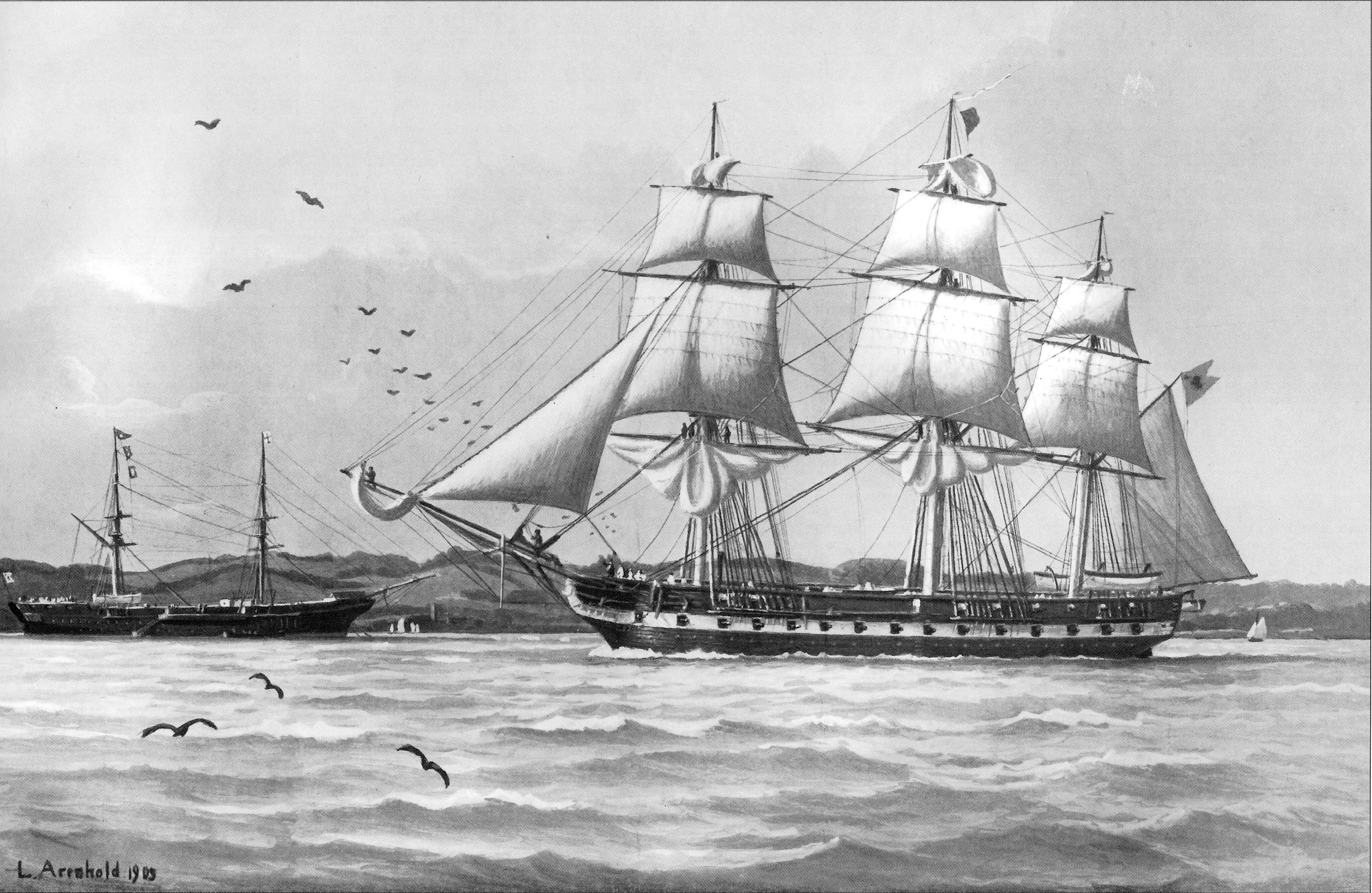
Painting of Barbarossa and Gefion by Lüder Arenhold

In mid-October 1850, a separate treaty between France and Denmark stipulated that the ship would remain German property. In November 1850, it was transferred to the North Sea under the Prussian flag and on November 30, 1850, off Heligoland, it was taken into the fleet of the German Confederation under the command of First Lieutenant Reichardt and recommissioned. Officers Thaulow and Neynaber were court-martialed for insubordination, but were acquitted.

In 1852, after the dissolution of the Reichsflotte, the ship was bought by Prussia together with the wheeled frigate Barbarossa and put into service under its old name of Gefion. From 1870, she was berthed in Kiel as a accommodation ship. She was struck from the navy list on 5 April 1880, and decommissioned on 5 May that year. The hull was used as a coal hulk and was scrapped at the Kaiserliche Werft in Kiel in the summer of 1891. The figurehead of the Gefion is now in Eckernförde's town hall; a replica serves in the Kurpark as the fountain figure of the Gefion fountain, where the original figurehead was located until about 1980. The ship's anchor can also be seen in the Kurpark.
