= German Empire (disambiguation) =

German Empire usually refers to the unified German monarchy existing from 1871 to 1918.

German Empire may also refer to:

- Holy Roman Empire, the central European empire dissolved by French Emperor Napoleon in 1806, that preceded the German Empire of 1871
- German Empire (1848–1849), a democratic, revolutionary and unified German state with its capital at Frankfurt
- German Reich, the unified state of Germany over the whole period from 1871 to 1945
- German colonial empire, German colonial territories (1884–1918)
- Weimar Republic, (1918–1933)
- Nazi Germany, Germany between 1933 and 1945, under Führer Adolf Hitler
  - The planned Greater Germanic Reich
- Fourth Reich, a hypothetical future empire

== See also ==
- Kingdom of Germany
