= Duckwitz =

Duckwitz (German pronunciation: [dʊkvɪts]) is a German surname, derived from a homonymous place in Behren-Lübchin. It is most prevalent in Germany and the United States.

Notable people with this surname include:

- Arnold Duckwitz (1802-1881), German statesman
- Eike Duckwitz (born 1980), German hockey player
- Georg Ferdinand Duckwitz (1904-1973), German diplomat
