= Imperial fleet =

Imperial fleet may refer to the fleet (usually the navy) of an empire. Examples include:

- Reichsflotte, the navy of the German Confederacy from 1848 to 1852
- Imperial German Navy (Kaiserliche Marine), the navy of the German Empire from 1871 to 1919
- Imperial Japanese Navy, navy of the Empire of Japan
- Roman navy, navy of the Roman Empire
