= List of German naval ministers =

State Secretary of the Naval Office
- Staatssekretäre im Reichsmarineamt des Deutschen Kaiserreiches

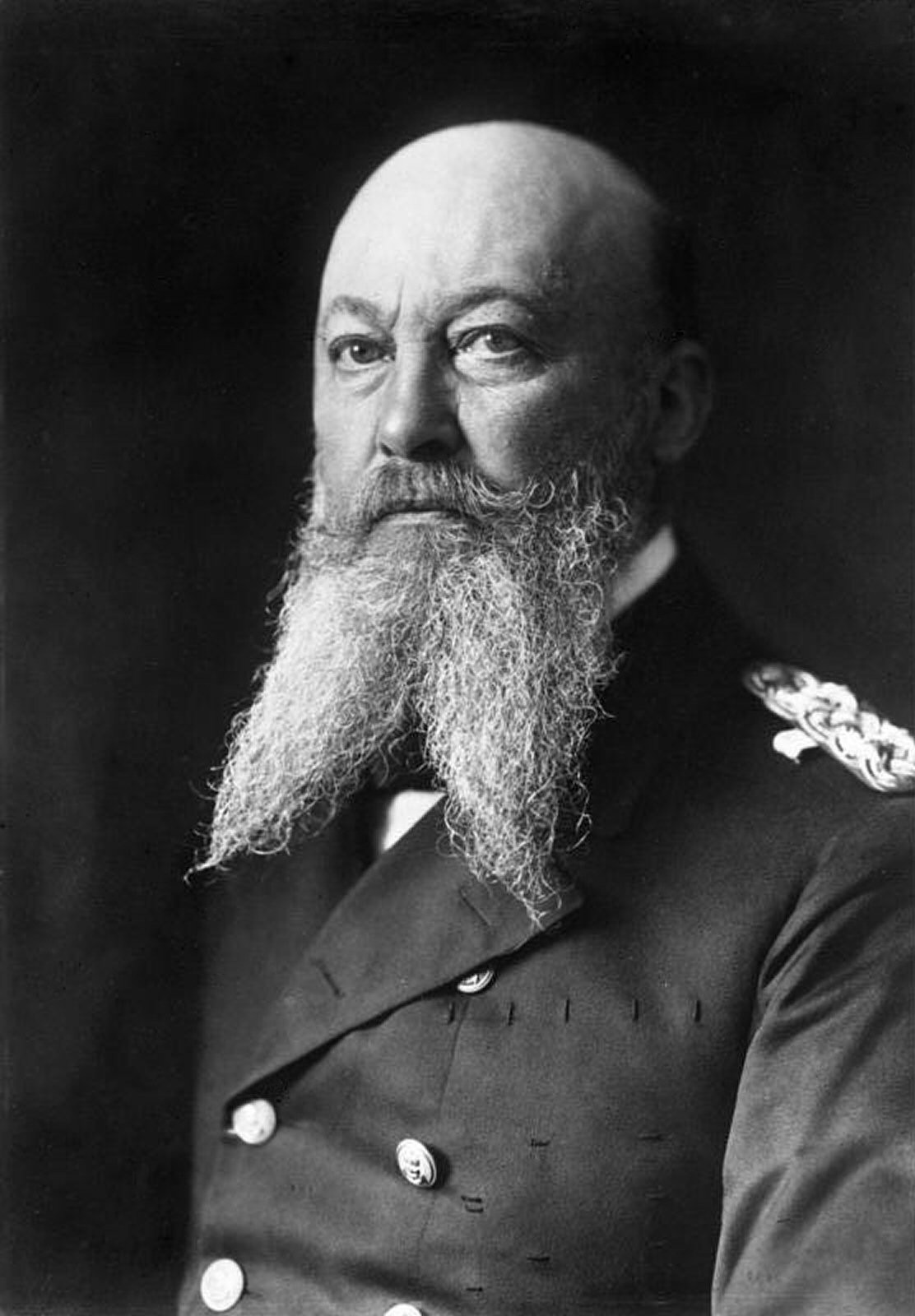
- Longest serving Alfred von Tirpitz (15 June 1897 – 12 March 1916)
- German Imperial Naval Office
- Status: Abolished
- Formation: 5 August 1848
- First holder: Arnold Duckwitz
- Final holder: Maximilian Rogge
- Abolished: 15 July 1919

This page lists German naval ministers.

== List ==
=== Reich Minister of the Navy in the Provisional Central Authority (1848–1849) ===
No.	Picture	Minister	Took office	Left office	Time in office
1	Arnold Duckwitz	Arnold Duckwitz (1802–1881) (As minister of Trade)	5 August 1848	16 May 1849	284 days
2	August Giacomo Jochmus	August Giacomo Jochmus (1808–1881)	22 May 1849	20 December 1849	212 days

=== Chief of the Imperial Admiralty (1872–1889) ===
No.	Picture	Chief	Took office	Left office	Time in office
1	Albrecht von Stosch	Admiral; Albrecht von Stosch (1818–1896)	1 January 1872	20 March 1883	11 years, 78 days
2	Leo von Caprivi	Vize Admiral; Leo von Caprivi (1831–1899)	20 March 1883	5 July 1888	5 years, 107 days
3	Alexander von Monts	Vize Admiral; Alexander von Monts (1832–1889)	5 July 1888	19 January 1889	198 days

=== State Secretaries to the Imperial Navy Office of the German Empire (1889–1919) ===
No.	Picture	Chief	Took office	Left office	Time in office
1	Karl Eduard Heusner	Vize Admiral; Karl Eduard Heusner (1843–1891)	21 January 1889	22 April 1890	1 year, 1 day
2	Friedrich von Hollmann	Admiral; Friedrich von Hollmann (1842–1913)	22 April 1890	15 June 1897	7 years, 144 days
3	Alfred von Tirpitz	Gross Admiral; Alfred von Tirpitz (1849–1930)	15 June 1897	12 March 1916	18 years, 271 days
4	Eduard von Capelle	Admiral; Eduard von Capelle (1855–1931)	12 March 1916	5 October 1918	2 years, 207 days
–	Paul Behncke	Admiral; Paul Behncke (1869–1937); Acting	28 August 1918	18 September 1918	21 days
5	Paul Behncke	Admiral; Paul Behncke (1869–1937)	18 September 1918	27 September 1918	9 days
6	Ernst Ritter von Mann Edler von Tiechler [de]	Vize Admiral; Ernst Ritter von Mann Edler von Tiechler (1864–1934)	5 October 1918	13 February 1919	131 days
7	Maximilian Rogge [de]	Vize Admiral; Maximilian Rogge (1866–1940)	13 February 1919	15 July 1919	152 days
