= RMS Britannia =

Cunard ocean liner

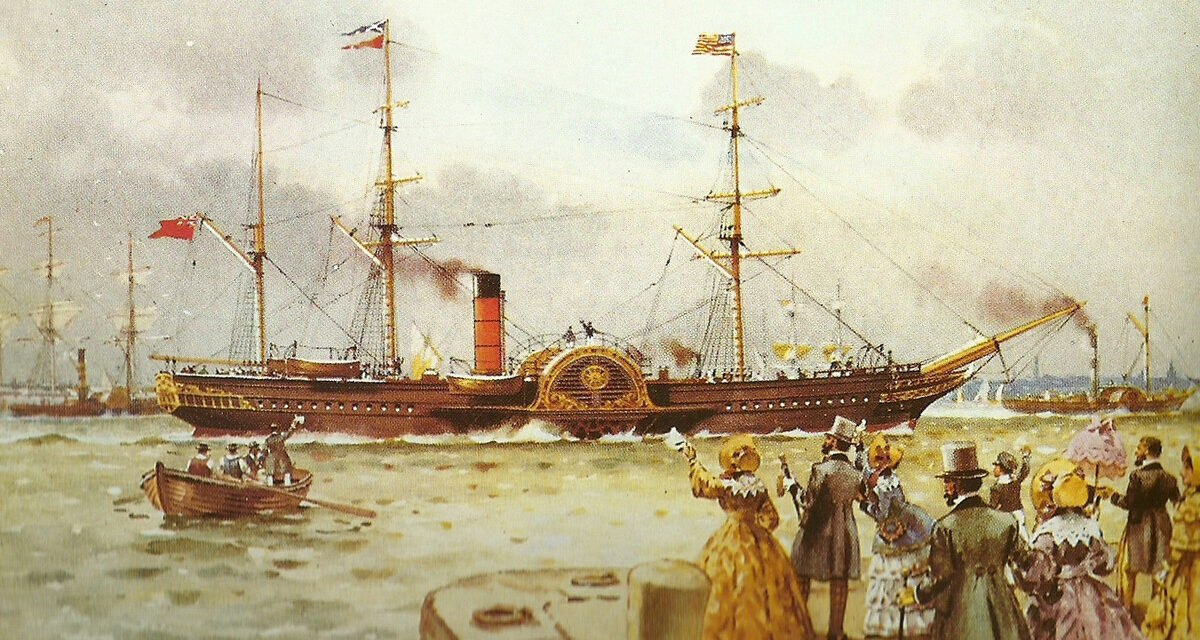
- RMS Britannia painted by Charles Turner, 1950s.

History

United Kingdom
- Name: RMS Britannia
- Namesake: Britannia
- Owner: British and North American Royal Mail Steam Packet Company
- Ordered: March 1839
- Builder: Robert Duncan & Company, Greenock, Scotland
- Launched: 5 February 1840
- Maiden voyage: 4 July 1840
- Out of service: Sold to the Reichsflotte in March 1849

German Confederation
- Name: SMS Barbarossa
- Acquired: March 1849
- Out of service: Transferred to the Prussian Navy in June 1852

Prussia
- Name: SMS Barbarossa
- Acquired: June 1852
- Fate: Sunk as a target ship in July 1880

General characteristics
- Class & type: Britannia-class steamship
- Tons burthen: 1,154
- Length: 207 ft (63 m)
- Beam: 34 ft (10 m)
- Draught: 16.8 ft (5.1 m)
- Propulsion: Paddle wheels; Two-cylinder side-lever engine; 740 ihp; Three masts
- Speed: 8.5 knots (15.7 km/h)
- Range: 640 tons coal
- Capacity: 115 passengers
- Crew: 82

RMS Britannia was an ocean liner of the British and North American Royal Mail Steam Packet Company, later known as Cunard Steamship Company. She was launched on 5 February 1840, at the yard of Robert Duncan & Company in Greenock, Scotland. The ship and her Britannia-class sisters, Acadia, Caledonia, and Columbia, were the first ocean liners built by the company.

== Description and service ==
Britannia was a large ship for the period, 207 feet (63 m) long and 34 feet (10.3 m) across the beam, with three masts and a wooden hull. She had paddle wheels and her coal-powered two-cylinder side-lever engine (from Robert Napier) had a power output of about 740 indicated horsepower with a coal consumption around 38 tons per day. She was relatively fast for the time: her usual speed was about 8.5 knots (16 km/h), but she could do better if the winds and currents were favourable. She had a tonnage, or carrying capacity, of 1,154 tons (by the Builder's Old Measurement). She was capable of carrying 115 passengers with a crew of 82.

On her maiden voyage, starting on 4 July 1840, she made Halifax, Nova Scotia, from Liverpool, England, in 12 days and 10 hours, continuing on to Boston, Massachusetts. The Britannia transported numerous types of cargo alongside its passengers. The cargo included 600 tons of coal; mail due across the Atlantic; livestock for food and milk; and cats to control the rat population. There were 115 passengers, with 82 crew members on board.

Her first homeward run from Halifax to Liverpool was made in just under 10 days at an average speed of about 11 knots (20 km/h), setting a new eastbound record which lasted until 1842.

She was joined by her sister ship Acadia in August 1840, by Caledonia in October 1840 and by Columbia in January 1841, each constructed by a different shipbuilder. All four ships could carry 115 passengers and 225 tons of cargo. The dining saloon was a long deck-house placed on the upper deck and there was also a 'ladies only' saloon. The fare to Halifax was 35 guineas (2,964 GPB in 2015) which included wines and spirits as well as food.

In January 1842 Charles Dickens and his wife travelled to the United States on Britannia. The weather was bad, he was seasick for most of the voyage and returned home on a sailing ship.

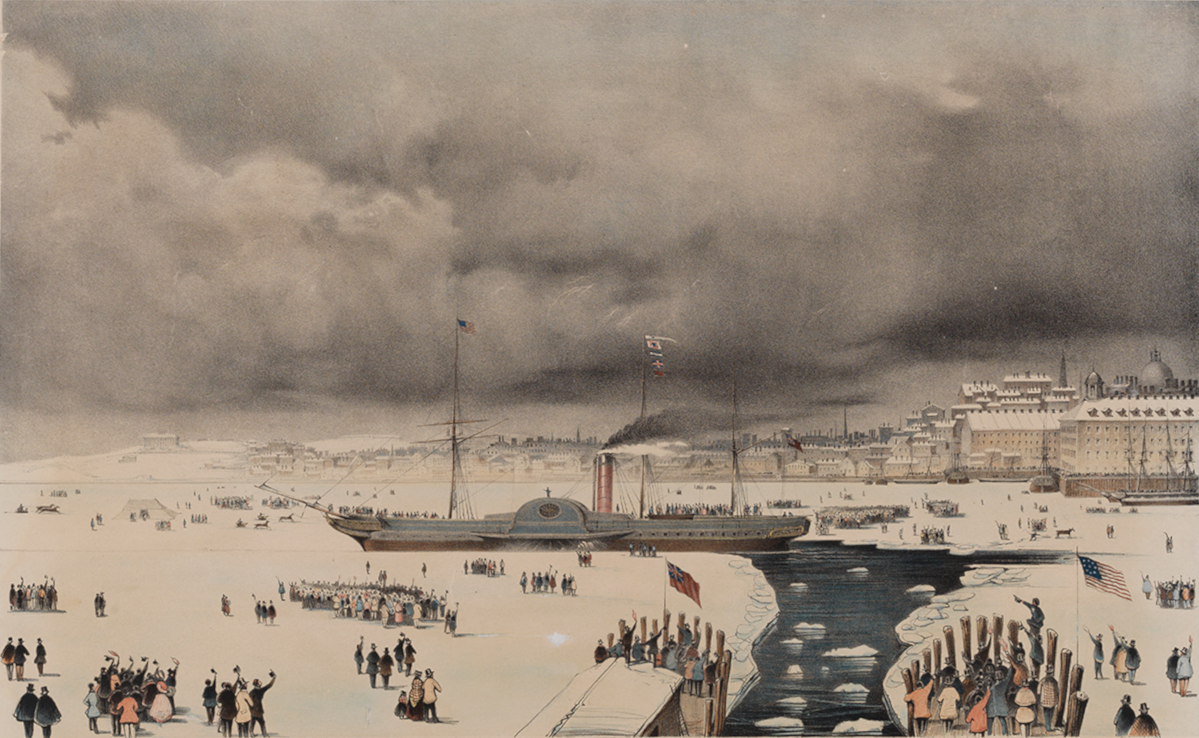
The B & N.A. Royal Mail Steamship Britannia John Hewitt, Commander, leaving her dock at East Boston on 3 February 1844 on her voyage to Liverpool (through) a canal cut in the ice 7 miles long

== As Barbarossa in German service ==
In March 1849 she was sold by Cunard to the revolutionary German confederation and was renamed SMS Barbarossa. She had nine guns fitted, and was the flagship of the Reichsflotte under Karl Rudolf Brommy in the Battle of Heligoland. In June 1852 she was transferred to the Prussian Navy and used as a barracks ship at Danzig. In May 1880 she was decommissioned from the Prussian Navy and in July 1880 she was sunk as a target ship.

== Film depiction of RMS Britannia ==
The funding and first crossing of Britannia were key plot elements in a Warner Brothers film released in 1941 as Atlantic Ferry in the UK, and Sons of the Sea in the U.S.

Records
Preceded by Great Western	Blue Riband (Eastbound record); 1840–1842	Succeeded by Great Western
