= German Naval Laws =

Series of laws expanding the navy of the German Empire, passed from 1898 to 1912

The Naval Laws (German: Flottengesetze, "Fleet Laws") were five separate laws passed by the German Empire, in 1898, 1900, 1906, 1908, and 1912. These acts, championed by Kaiser Wilhelm II and his State Secretary for the Navy, Grand Admiral Alfred von Tirpitz, committed Germany to building up a navy capable of competing with the Royal Navy of the United Kingdom.

== German desires and the strategic debate ==
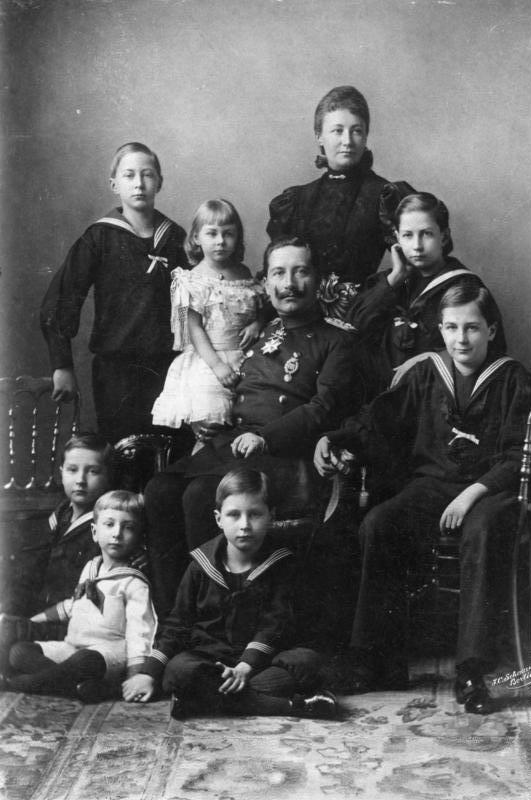
1896 photo of Kaiser Wilhelm II with his family, his sons wearing sailor uniforms

The Kaiser had long wanted a large naval force to assure Germany of what he called "a place in the sun". A large German navy could assist in German attempts to attain colonies, as well as further the country's economic and commercial interests elsewhere in the world. He was determined to make his country a colonial power in Africa and the Pacific. He was also a very militaristic man, and wished to increase the strength of the German armed forces; in particular he wanted to develop a navy that could match the British Royal Navy. As he wrote in his autobiography:

I had a peculiar passion for the navy. It sprang to no small extent from my English blood. When I was a little boy...I admired the proud British ships. There awoke in me the will to build ships of my own like these some day, and when I was grown up to possess a fine navy as the English.

— Kaiser Wilhelm II, My Early Life

Though Wilhelm loved naval power, he was initially unsure what form the German Navy would take: a force made up primarily of smaller vessels such as cruisers, or larger vessels such as battleships. He initially leaned toward cruisers because they could go to all corners of the globe and display the German flag wherever they went, while battleships were large and cumbersome and thus needed to stay in the Baltic or North Sea. The Secretary of the German Imperial Naval Office, Admiral Friedrich von Hollmann, also favoured cruisers because they were cheaper and more suited to German maritime strategy, which then emphasized coastal defence. However, Admiral Alfred von Tirpitz, the leading proponent of battleships for the German Navy, argued that because Germany did not have many colonies or overseas coaling stations, cruiser warfare did not make sense. Rather, it was important to concentrate a large fleet of battleships in close proximity to the strongest sea power, as this was the only way that Germany could compete with Britain (the world's leading naval and colonial power) and thus achieve world power for itself. Tirpitz further claimed that the mere existence of a large battleship fleet would indirectly protect German colonies and commerce the world over, despite the battleships' limited range. The victory of the battleship camp in this strategic debate was cemented when Tirpitz replaced Hollmann as State Secretary for the Navy.

On 15 June 1897, Tirpitz unveiled a memorandum that was to alter European history. In this document, he argued that in order to defeat the strongest naval power, a fleet of battleships was necessary. He then proceeded to reverse his argument: if battleships were necessary, Germany's enemy must be the strongest naval power – Britain. Tirpitz's plans were predicated on "risk theory" – even if the German fleet was smaller than that of Britain, it had to be able to inflict damage on the Royal Navy that was severe enough to endanger British dominance of the seas. The losses would be so heavy that another power, perhaps a German ally or British foe, could then swoop in and destroy the remnants of the British fleet. To avoid such a costly naval confrontation with Germany, British diplomacy would become more accommodating towards German colonial and economic desires. Tirpitz felt that such a massive shipbuilding program could only work if its particulars were enshrined in law; this would commit the navy to building a fixed number of ships in advance, ensure that the fleet was built up continuously, and avoid the need to haggle for the money to build each ship in the Reichstag. The stage was thus set for a set of laws that would precipitate the transformation of Anglo-German relations.

== Naval Laws ==
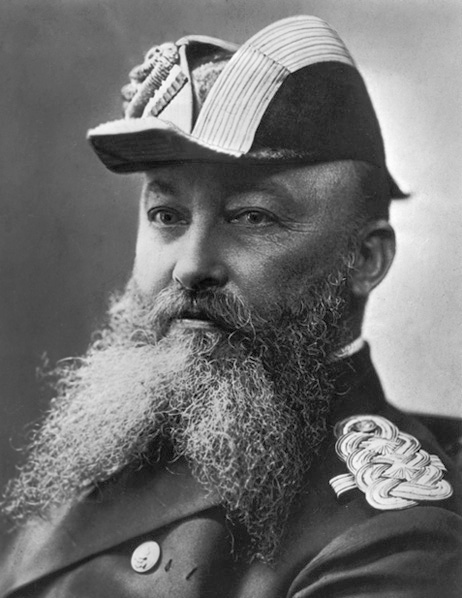
Alfred von Tirpitz, the architect of the German Navy's expansion

At the turn of the 20th century, Britain adhered to the "Two-Power Standard": the Royal Navy had to be equal in strength to that of the next two naval powers combined. The standard, long accepted unofficially, was made official by the Naval Defence Act 1889, and designated the French and Russian navies as the most likely adversaries for Britain on the high seas. However, the German Naval Laws advocated by Tirpitz began to threaten this standard.

The First Naval Law, introduced to the Reichstag in late 1897, outlined the composition of the fleet by vessel class and the number of ships to be constructed by 1904 and also set a cost limit. It authorized a fixed number of battleships that would not be altered by an annual parliamentary vote, proposing that 16 battleships be built in the following three years. The law passed the Reichstag on 26 March 1898 over the opposition of the Conservative Party and the Social Democratic Party, who were against spending vast amounts of money on naval warfare. Its ramifications were not immediately evident, as the seven battleships it called for would not be sufficient to fight either the British or French navies.

Germany's real threat to the Royal Navy began with the Second Naval Law. During the Second Boer War (1899–1902), the Germans greatly sympathized with the Boers, whom they considered a racially and culturally akin people. In January 1900, British cruisers on patrol detained three German mail steamers off the coast of Africa to search them, suspecting them of carrying materiel to the Boers. Although the British quickly apologized, the Germans were outraged, and Admiral von Tirpitz took advantage of the anger to introduce a new naval bill, which passed through the Reichstag with very little opposition on 14 June of that year. This law doubled the size of the fleet from 19 to 38 battleships; two flagships, four battle squadrons of eight battleships each, and four reserve battleships were to be constructed over seventeen years, from 1901 to 1917. This law made clear that not only was the German Navy to be a powerful battle fleet instead of a coastal defence force (in the process turning Germany into the second-strongest naval power in the world), but that the primary opponent of this enlarged fleet was to be the United Kingdom.

The next 12 years saw the Reichstag pass three more Naval Laws, in 1906, 1908, and 1912; in each case, Tirpitz took advantage of a sense of crisis and alarm in Germany to ensure the success of the legislation. In June 1906, the Third Naval Law, mandating the construction of six large cruisers, became law following the German failure to break the Entente Cordiale at the Algeciras Conference. The Fourth Naval Law of April 1908 pared down the age at which battleships were to be replaced from 25 to 20 years, and was sparked by a feeling that King Edward VII and Great Britain were trying to encircle Germany. The Fifth Naval Law, sparked by the German retreat in the Agadir Crisis of 1911, passed in June 1912 and added three more battleships to the building program.

== British response ==
Throughout the 1890s, Britain had been building its own battleships on a massive scale, and was more preoccupied with France and Russia than Germany, which it viewed more as an ally than as an enemy. However, the Second Naval Law, with its rapid expansion of the German fleet, began to gravely worry the island nation. German naval expansion threatened British control of the seas, which was vital not only to the maintenance of the British Empire, but also to the security of the British Isles themselves, as naval supremacy had long shielded Britain from invasion. As Lord Selborne, the First Lord of the Admiralty, informed Prime Minister Lord Salisbury and the rest of the British Cabinet on 15 November 1901:

The naval policy of Germany is definite and persistent. The Emperor seems determined that the power of Germany shall be used all over the world to push German commerce, possessions, and interests. Of necessity, it follows that German naval strength must be raised so as to compare more advantageously than at present with ours. The result of this policy will be to place Germany in a commanding position if ever we find ourselves at war with France and Russia...Naval officers who have seen much of the German Navy lately are all agreed that it is as good as can be.

In an October 1902 Cabinet paper, Selborne elaborated further on the German naval threat to Britain:

The more the composition of the new German fleet is examined, the clearer it becomes that it is designed for a possible conflict with the British fleet. It cannot be designed for the purpose of playing a leading part in a future war between Germany and France and Russia. The issue of such a war can only be decided by armies on land, and the great naval expenditure on which Germany has embarked involves a deliberate diminution of the military strength which Germany might otherwise have attained in relation to France and Russia.

As a result, the British began to shift their foreign and naval policies to meet the German threat. From 1902 onward, an Anglo-German naval arms race developed as the Admiralty advocated the Two-Power Standard plus an additional six battleships over and above parity with the French and Russians. Diplomatically, the British forever abandoned Splendid Isolation by concluding the Anglo-Japanese Alliance in 1902, then followed it two years later by signing the Entente cordiale with their long-time rivals, the French. With the signing of the Anglo-Russian Entente in 1907, the German fear of encirclement became a reality.

Under Sir John Fisher, who served as First Sea Lord from 1904 to 1910, the Royal Navy underwent a period of revolutionary change. Since the autumn of 1902, Fisher had viewed Germany as Britain's principal naval enemy, and so he redistributed the Fleet such that the biggest and most powerful ships were situated for battle against the Germans. The Home Fleet was renamed the Channel Fleet and ordered to remain in the proximity of the English Channel, while the former Channel Fleet, based at Gibraltar, was redesignated the Atlantic Fleet. Four battleships transferred from the Mediterranean Fleet and five from China enlarged the Channel Fleet to 17 battleships, while the eight battleships of the Atlantic Fleet could move north toward the British Isles or east into the Mediterranean Sea.

== Fleet strengths mandated by the Naval Laws, 1898–1912 ==
=== 1898 Naval Law ===
Signed into law 10 April 1898.

==== Vessels in full commission ====
- 1 Fleet flagship,
- 2 battle squadrons, each with 8 battleships,
- 2 divisions, each with 4 coastal ironclads,
- 6 large cruisers and 16 light cruisers as scouts for the home fleet,
- 3 large cruisers and 10 light cruisers for foreign service.

material reserve

- 2 battleships,
- 3 large cruisers,
- 4 light cruisers.

replacement schedule

- Battleships and coastal ironclads after 25 years,
- large cruiser after 20 years,
- light cruisers after 15 years.

Total (to be attained by 1903)

- 19 battleships (12 existing; 7 additional vessels to be built),
- 8 coastal ironclads (8 existing),
- 12 large cruisers (10 existing, 2 additional vessels to be built),
- 30 light cruisers (23 existing, 7 additional vessels to be built).

=== 1900 Naval Law ===
Signed into law 14 June 1900.

==== Battle Fleet ====
- 2 Fleet flagships,
- 4 squadrons, each of 8 battleships,
- 8 large cruisers,
- 24 light cruisers.

foreign fleet

- 3 large cruisers,
- 10 light cruisers.

material reserve

- 4 battleships,
- 3 large cruisers,
- 4 light cruisers.

replacement schedule

- battleships after 25 years,
- cruisers after 20 years.

Total (to be attained by 1920)

- 38 battleships (19 additional vessels to be built),
- 14 large cruisers (2 additional vessels to be built),
- 38 small cruisers (8 additional vessels to be built),
- 96 torpedo boats in 16 divisions of 6 boats each.

=== 1906 Amendment ===
Approved 19 May 1906; strength unchanged except for 5 extra large cruisers for the foreign fleet plus 1 extra large cruiser in material reserve, and 48 additional torpedo boats.

=== 1908 Amendment ===
Approved 27 March 1908; authorized strength of fleet remained unchanged, but decreased replacement age of battleships to 20 years (thereby speeding up the construction of modern vessels) and mandated new large cruisers be battlecruisers.

=== 1912 Amendment ===
Approved 21 May 1912

==== Battle Fleet ====
- 1 Fleet flagship,
- 5 squadrons (3 active, 2 in reserve), each of 8 battleships,
- 10 large cruisers (8 active, 2 reserve),
- 30 light cruisers (18 active, 12 reserve).

foreign fleet

- 8 large cruisers,
- 10 light cruisers.

flotillas

- 3 flotilla leaders,
- 108 torpedo boats,
- 54 submarines.

material reserve

- 36 torpedo boats,
- 18 submarines,
- 1 flotilla leader.

Total

- 41 battleships (3 additional vessels to be built),
- 18 large cruisers,
- 40 small cruisers (2 additional vessels to be built),
- 4 flotilla leaders,
- 144 torpedo boats,
- 72 submarines (12-year replacement age).

== See also ==
- Causes of World War I
- High Seas Fleet – The German Fleet in World War I
- Kaiserliche Marine – History of The German Imperial Navy 1871–1918
