= German Navy (disambiguation) =

German Navy may refer to:

- Reichsflotte, the first German Navy
- North German Federal Navy, the Navy of the North German Confederation
- Imperial German Navy, the Navy of the German Empire
- Reichsmarine, the interwar German navy
- Kriegsmarine, the World War II navy of Nazi Germany
- Bundesmarine, the post-World War II West German navy
- Volksmarine, the post-World War II East German people's navy
- German Navy, the post-reunification German Navy (Deutsche Marine)

== See also ==
- German naval history (disambiguation)
