= German Empire (1848–1849) =

Unsuccessful attempt of creating a unified German state in 1848 in the era of revolutions

German Empire Deutsches Reich
- 1848–1849
- Flag Coat of arms

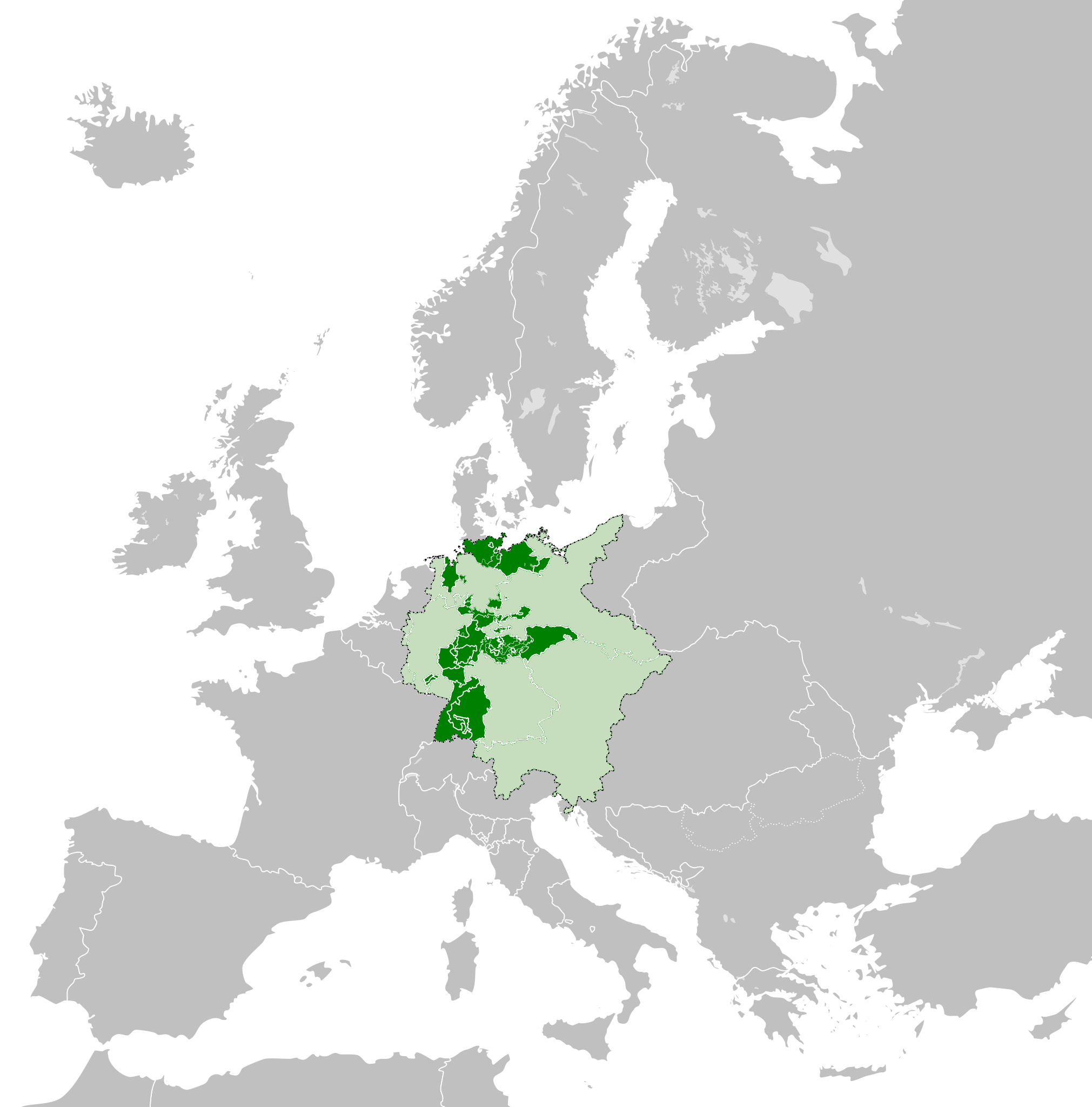
- The German Empire's controlled territories and its claims: Controlled territories; Claimed territories

- Status: Quasi-state
- Capital: Frankfurt
- Demonym: German
- Government: Confederal parliamentary monarchy
- Emperor of the Germans-elect
  - 1849: Frederick William IV (Note: Frederick William IV was offered the imperial crown, but refused to "pick up a crown from the gutter".)
- Imperial Regent
  - 1848–1849: Archduke John (Note: Elected by the Frankfurt National Assembly as Imperial Vicar of a new German Reich. The German Confederation was considered dissolved.)
- Prime Minister
  - 1848 (first): Karl, Prince of Leiningen
  - 1849 (last): August Ludwig zu Sayn-Wittgenstein-Berleburg
- Legislature: Frankfurt National Assembly
- Historical era: Concert of Europe
  - German Revolution of 1848: February 1848
  - Frankfurt Constitution: 28 March 1849
  - Frankfurt National Assembly dissolved: 31 May 1849
  - German Confederation restored: 1850
Preceded by	Succeeded by
German Confederation	German Confederation
- Today part of: Federal Republic of Germany

The first iteration of a German Empire or German Realm (German: Deutsches Reich) was a proto-state which briefly attempted, but ultimately failed, to unify the German states within the German Confederation to create a German nation-state. It was created in the spring of 1848 during the German revolutions by the Frankfurt National Assembly. The parliament elected Archduke John of Austria as its provisional head of state with the title 'Imperial Regent'. On 28 March 1849, its constitution was implemented and the parliament elected the king of Prussia, Frederick William IV, to be the constitutional monarch of the empire with the title 'Emperor of the Germans'. However, he turned the position down. The empire came to an end in December 1849 when the Central German Government was replaced by a Federal Central Commission.

The German National Assembly (Frankfurt Parliament) considered itself the parliament of a new empire and enacted imperial laws. It installed a provisional government and created the first fleet of all Germany. In May 1849, larger German states such as Austria and Prussia forced members of parliament to resign. The provisional government lasted until December of that year. In summer 1851, the reinstalled Bundestag of the German Confederation declared the imperial legislation to be void. However, the German Bundestag and the states never called the provisional government illegal, and during its existence, the empire was officially recognised by several foreign countries, such as the Netherlands, Switzerland and the United States.

The legacy of the empire persists today; as well as the period seeing the first all-German elections in 1848, the creation of a German constitution in 1849, the modern German Navy celebrates 14 June as its anniversary because of the decision in 1848 to create a unified German fleet. The flag adopted by the empire by law in November 1848 is today the flag of modern Germany (black-red-gold).

== History ==
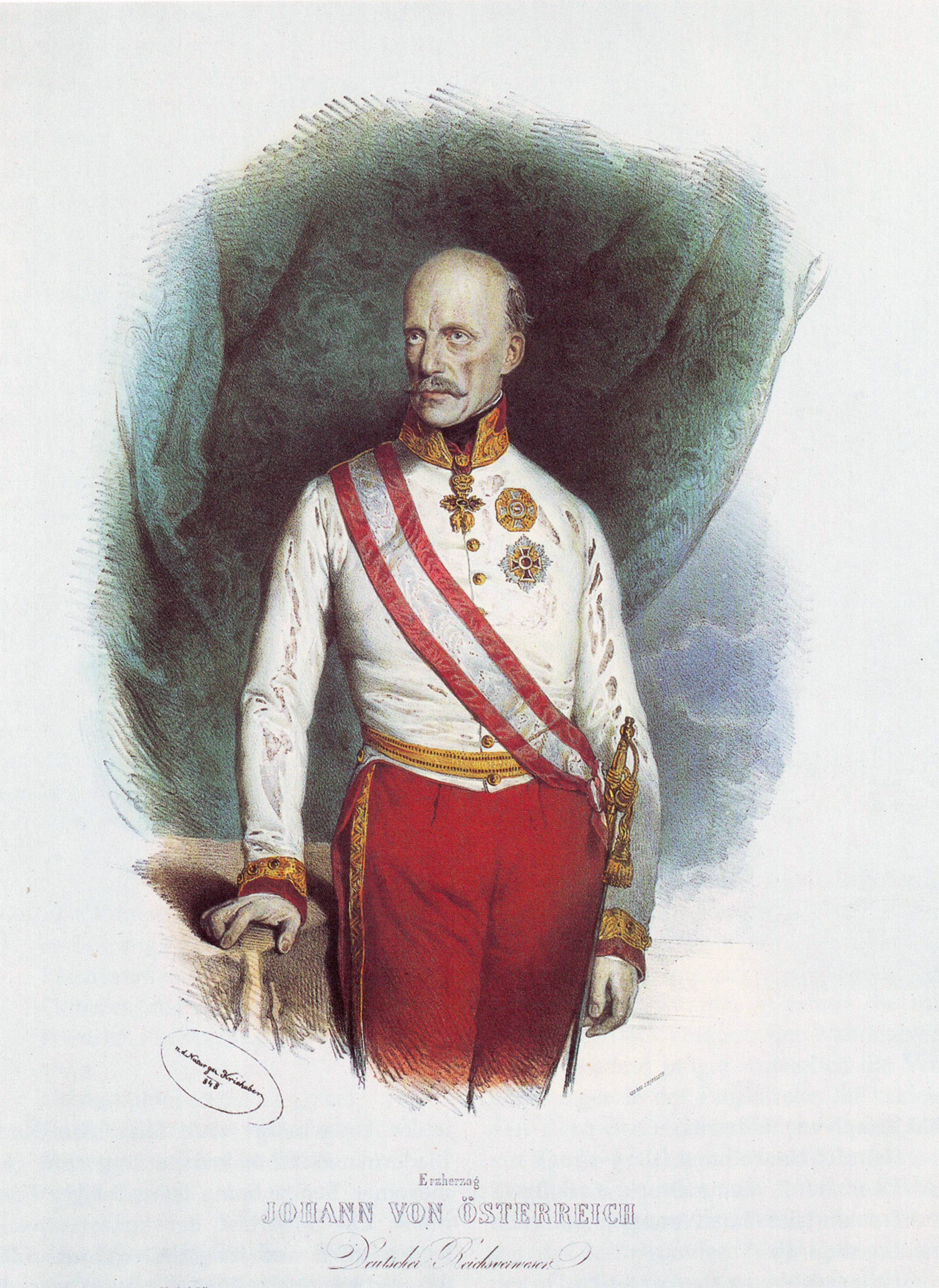
Archduke John of Austria, the Imperial Regent and uncle of the Austrian Emperor

The state was created by the Frankfurt Parliament in spring 1848, following the March Revolution. The empire ended in December 1849 when the Central German Government was replaced with a Federal Central Commission.

The Empire struggled to be recognized by both German and foreign states. The German states, represented by the Federal Convention of the German Confederation, on 12 July 1848, acknowledged the Central German Government. In the following months, however, the larger German states did not always accept the decrees and laws of the Central German Government and the Frankfurt Parliament.

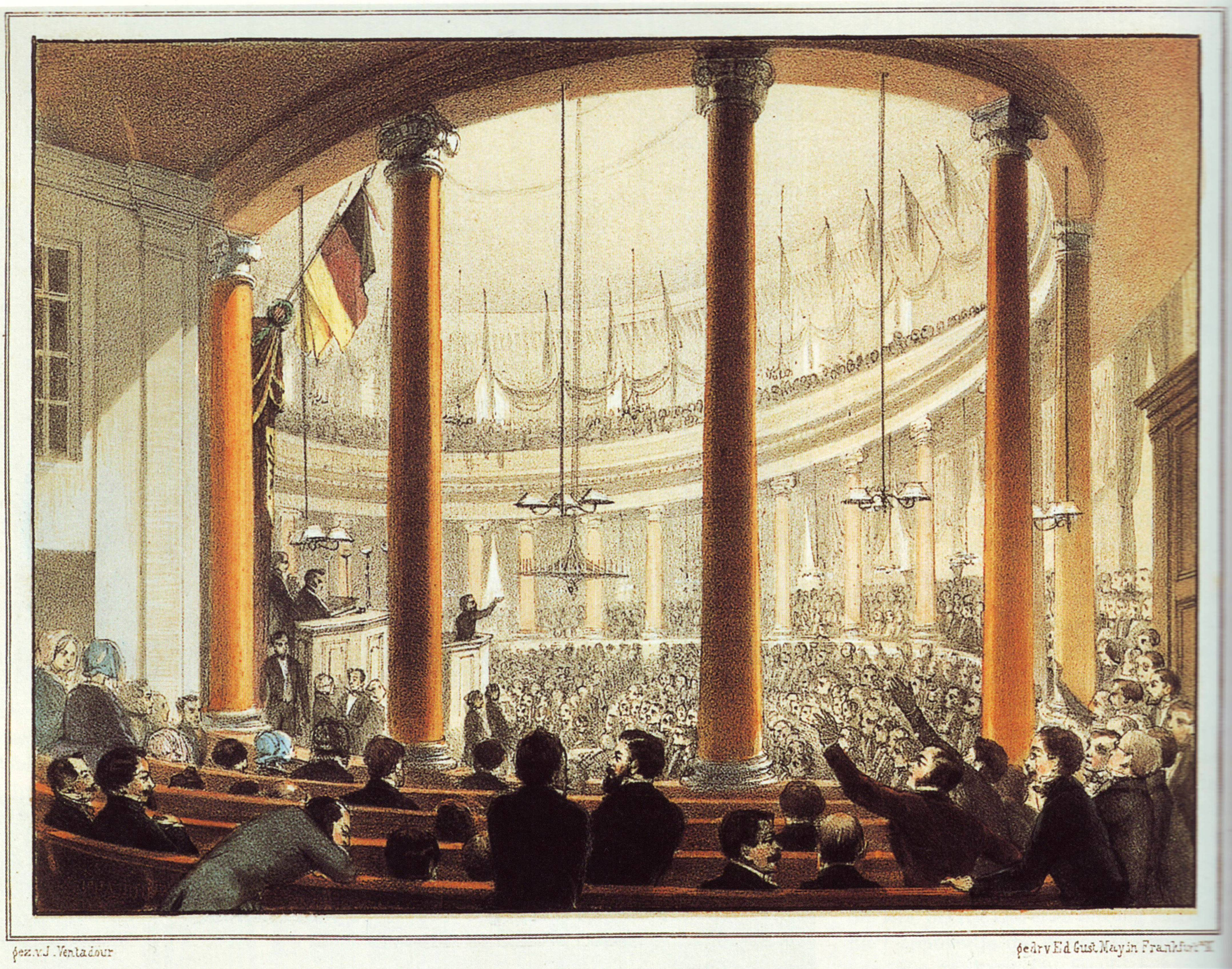
German National Assembly in St. Paul's Church, Frankfurt

The Zentralgewaltgesetz was the basis for Central German Government.

Several foreign states recognized the Central Government and sent ambassadors: the United States, Sweden, the Netherlands, Belgium, Switzerland, Sardinia, the Two Sicilies, and Greece. The French Second Republic and the United Kingdom of Great Britain and Ireland installed official envoys to keep contact with the Central Government.

The first constitutional order of the German Empire was the Imperial Law concerning the introduction of a provisional Central Power for Germany, on 28 June 1848. With the order, the Frankfurt Parliament established the offices of Reichsverweser (Imperial Regent, a provisional monarch) and imperial ministers. A second constitutional order, the Frankfurt Constitution, on 28 March 1849, was accepted by 28 German states but not by the larger ones. Prussia, along with other German states, forced the Frankfurt Parliament into dissolution.

Several of this German Empire's accomplishments outlasted it: the Frankfurt Constitution was used as a model in other states in the decades to follow, and the electoral law was used nearly verbatim in 1867 for the election of the Reichstag of the North German Confederation. The Reichsflotte (Imperial Fleet) created by the Frankfurt Parliament lasted until 1852. The imperial law issuing a decree concerning bills of exchange (Allgemeine Deutsche Wechselordnungen, General German exchange bills) was considered to apply to nearly all of Germany.

== Continuity and status ==
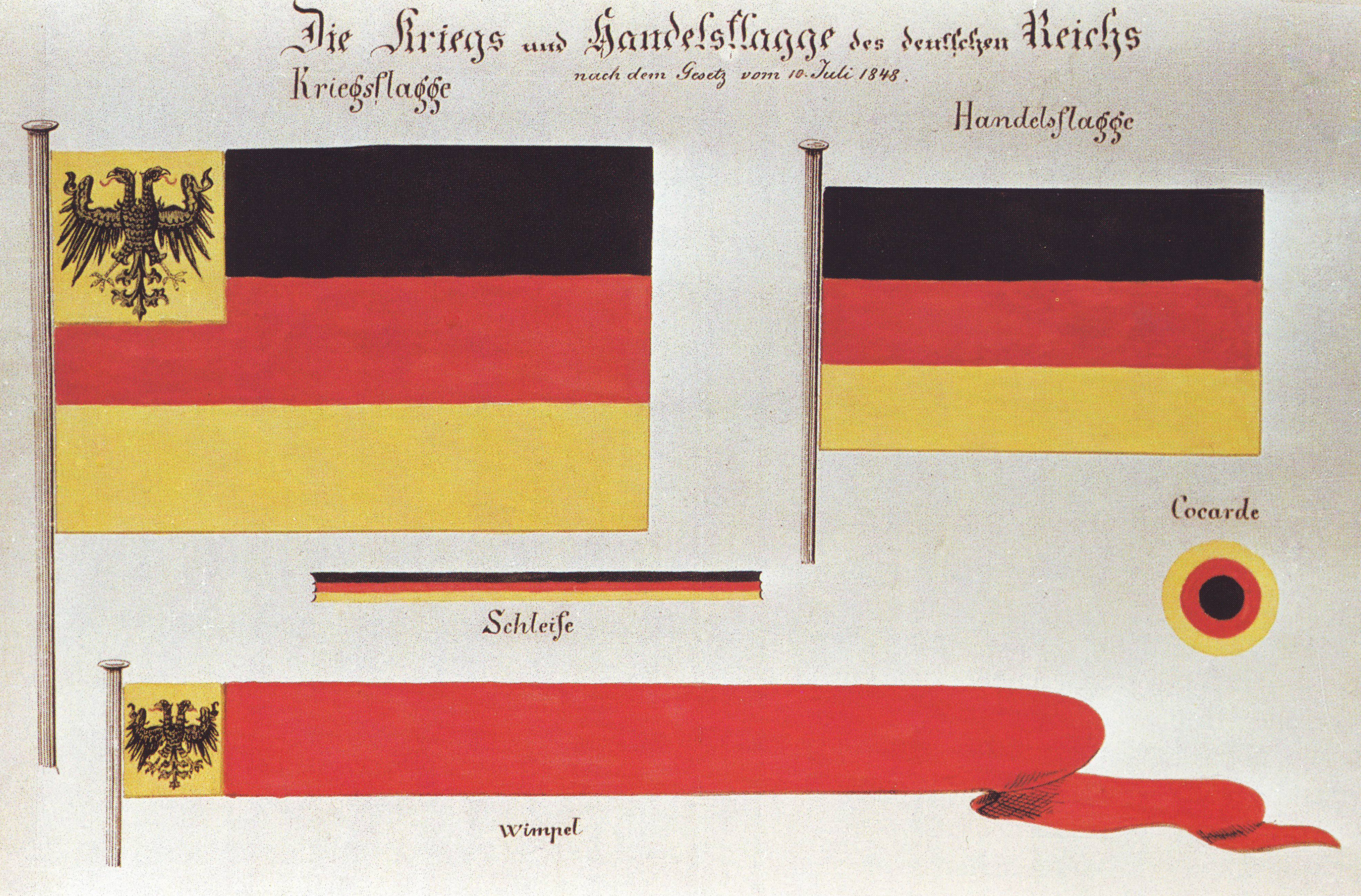
Imperial war and commerce flag according to the law of 12 November 1848

Contemporaries and scholars had different opinions about the statehood of the German Empire of 1848/1849:

- One group followed a positivist point of view: law was statutory law. A constitution for Germany had to be agreed upon with the governments of all German states. This was the opinion of the monarchists and the German states.
- The other group valued natural law and the principle of the sovereignty of the people higher; the National Assembly alone had the power to establish a constitution. This was the opinion of the majority of the Frankfurt Parliament, but especially the republican left.

In reality, the distinction was less clear. The majority of the Frankfurt Parliament, based on the liberal groups, wanted to establish a dualist system with a sovereign monarch whose powers would be constrained by a constitution and parliament.

The German Confederation was created in 1815. This treaty organization for the defense of the German territories lacked, in the view of the national movement, a government and a parliament. But it was generally acknowledged by German and foreign powers that to establish a national state, it was easiest to present it as the continuation of the Confederation. This was actually the road the National Assembly took, although it originally saw itself as a revolutionary organ.

The continuity between the old Confederation and the new organs was based on two decisions of the Confederation's Federal Convention:

- The Federal Convention (representing the German states' governments) called for elections of the Frankfurt Parliament in April/May 1848.
- The German states immediately acknowledged Archduke John, the provisional head of state elected by the Frankfurt Parliament. On 12 July 1848, the Federal Convention ended its activities in favor of the Imperial Regent, Archduke John. This was an implicit recognition of the Law concerning the Central Power of 28 June.

The German states and the Federal Convention made those decisions under pressure from the revolution. They wanted to avoid a breakup with the Frankfurt Parliament. (Already in August, this pressure faltered, and the larger states started to regain power.) According to historian Ernst Rudolf Huber, it was possible to determine a continuity or even legal identity of Confederation and the new Federal State. The old institution was enhanced with a (provisional) constitutional order, and the name German Confederation was changed to German Empire. Ulrich Huber notes that none of the German states declared the Imperial Regent John and his government to be usurpatory or illegal.

== State power, territory and people ==
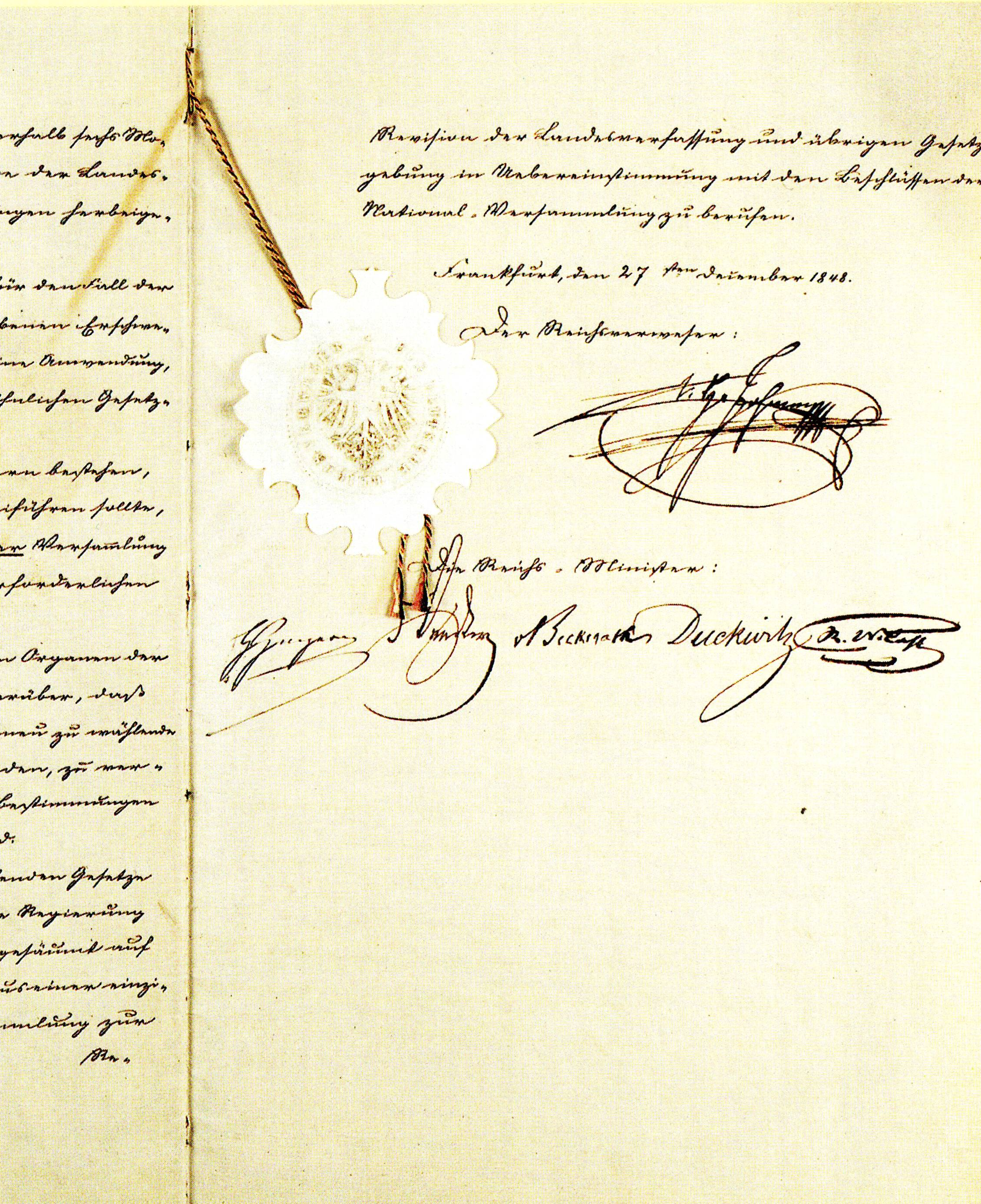
Introductory law of the Basic Rights, 27 December 1848, with the signature of the Imperial Regent

The Frankfurt Assembly saw itself as the German national legislature, as made explicit in the Imperial Law concerning the declaration of the imperial laws and the decrees of the provisional Central Power, from 27 September 1848. It issued laws earlier, such as the law of 14 June that created the Imperial Fleet. Maybe the most notable law declared the highly acclaimed Basic Rights of the German People, 27 December 1848.

The Central Power or Central Government consisted of the Imperial Regent, Archduke John, and the ministers he appointed. He usually appointed those politicians who had the support of the Frankfurt Parliament, at least until May 1849. One of the ministers, the Prussian general Eduard von Peucker, was charged with the federal troops and federal fortifications of the German Confederation. The Central Government had not much to govern, as the administration remained in the hands of the individual states. But in February 1849, 105 people worked for the Central Government (in comparison to the 10 for the Federal Convention).

The Frankfurt Parliament assumed in general that the territory of the German Confederation was also the territory of the new state. Someone was a German if he was a subject of one of the German states within the German Empire (§ 131, Frankfurt Constitution). Additionally, it discussed the future of other territories where Germans lived. The members of parliament sometimes referred to the German language spoken in a territory, sometimes to historical rights, sometimes to military considerations (for example, one of the arguments given against countenancing an independent Polish state was that it would be too weak to serve as a buffer state against Russia). One of the most disputed territories was Schleswig.

=== Prime Ministers of the German Empire (1848–1849) ===
(Provisional Central Authority – Frankfurt Parliament)

- 1. Karl, Prince of Leiningen

Term: 15 July 1848 – 5 September 1848

Description: The first Prime Minister of the new German central government created by the Frankfurt Parliament. A liberal aristocrat who supported constitutional unification of Germany. His government struggled with limited power because the German princes resisted central authority. Resigned after losing support within the National Assembly.

- 2. Anton von Schmerling

Term: 5 September 1848 – 15 December 1848

Description: An Austrian liberal statesman and influential figure in the Frankfurt Parliament. Tried to strengthen the authority of the central government. Supported a Greater German solution (including Austria). His cabinet failed to gain cooperation from the German states and resigned.

- 3. Heinrich von Gagern

Term: 17 December 1848 – 10 May 1849

Description: One of Germany’s leading liberals and former President of the Frankfurt Parliament. Advocated the Lesser German solution (unification under Prussia, without Austria). Oversaw the final drafting of the Frankfurt Constitution (March 1849). Resigned when the Prussian king refused the offered imperial crown and the constitution collapsed.

=== Cabinet of Karl, Prince of Leiningen (5 August 1848 – 6 September 1848) ===
- Karl, Prince of Leiningen – Minister-President (Head of Government)
- Anton von Schmerling – Minister of the Interior & of Justice
- Hermann von Beckerath – Minister of Finance
- Eduard von Peucker – Minister of War
- Friedrich Christoph Dahlmann – Minister of Foreign Affairs
- Heinrich von Gagern – Minister without Portfolio (later Foreign Minister after Dahlmann resigned)

=== Cabinet of Anton von Schmerling (24 September 1848 – 15 December 1848) ===
- Anton von Schmerling – Minister-President / Minister of the Interior / Minister of Foreign Affairs
- Eduard von Peucker – Minister of War
- Robert Mohl – Minister of Justice
- Hermann von Beckerath – Minister of Finance
- Arnold Duckwitz – Minister of Trade

=== Cabinet of Heinrich von Gagern (15 December 1848 – 20 May 1849) ===
- Heinrich von Gagern – Prime Minister, Interior and Foreign Affairs
- Eduard von Peucker – Minister of War
- Robert von Mohl – Minister of Justice)
- Hermann von Beckerath – Minister of Finance
- Arnold Duckwitz – Minister of Trade
