= Battle of Eckernförde =

- Part of the First Schleswig War
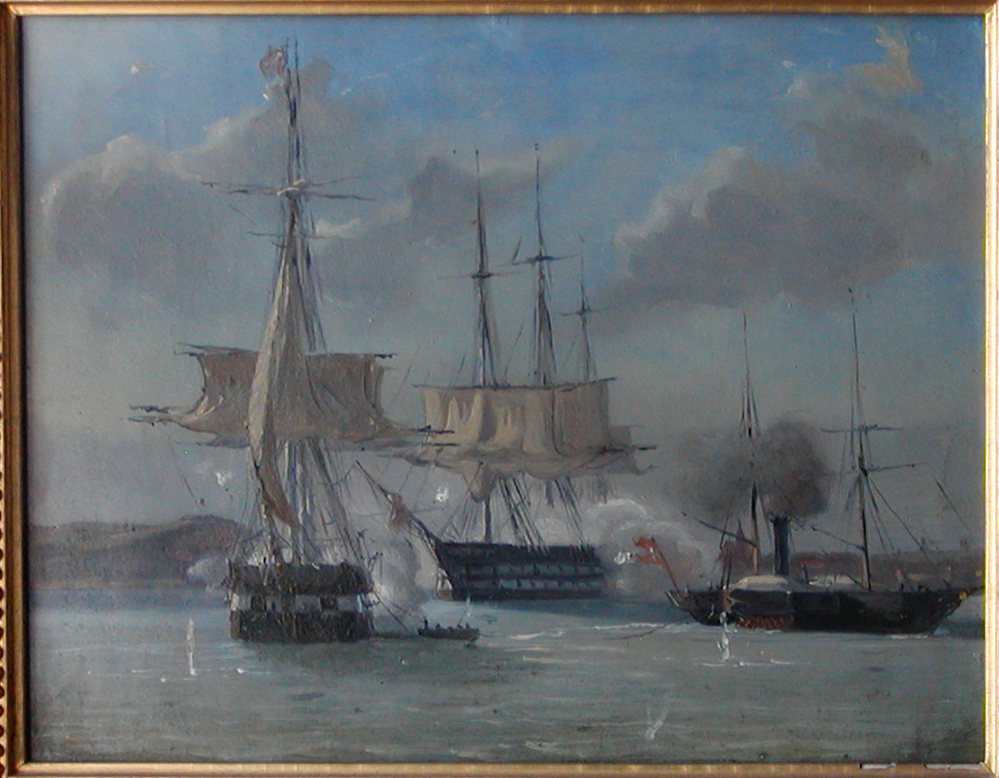
- Battle between the navies of Denmark and Schleswig-Holstein at Eckernförde Fjord
Date	5 April 1849
Location	Schleswig Bay, near Kiel
Result	Schleswig-Holsteinian victory

Belligerents
Schleswig-Holstein	Denmark

Commanders and leaders
(Schleswig-Holstein) Eduard Julius Jungmann (Schleswig-Holstein) Ernest II	(Denmark) Frederik Paludan (surrendered) (Denmark) Christian Krieger †

Strength
91 artillerymen 10 guns: 2 84-pounder guns; 2 24-pounder guns; 6 18-pounder guns	1 ship of the line (Christian VIII, 84 guns); 1 frigate (Gefion, 48 guns) 2 steamers (Hekla & Geiser); 3 chases

Casualties and losses
4 killed 14 wounded	231 killed 89 wounded 936 captured 1 ship of the line destroyed 1 small ship captured

The Battle of Eckernförde was a Danish naval assault on Schleswig. The Danes were defeated and two of their ships were lost, with the surviving crew being detained.

== Background ==
When the fighting resumed after the armistice of Malmö in 1849, the Danes attacked Sundeved and Schleswig. To support the offensive, the Danish Navy would carry out a diversionary attack on the town of Eckernförde and destroy the German coastal batteries there. A smaller force of 250 troops would also be put ashore to give the impression of a larger landing force. The German flanks were vulnerable to landings along the coasts of Schleswig and such a company could not be ignored by the Germans. Commander Frederik August Paludan was appointed commander of the operation.

== The Danish Squadron ==
The Danish force assigned to the attack consisted of:

- Ship of the line Christian VIII (84 guns) – Frederik Paludan
- Frigate Gefion (48 guns) – J. A. Meyer
- The steamships Hekla and Geiser – Christian Krieger

== German fortress defense ==
Eckernförde was defended by two coastal batteries with the following equipment:

- 2x 84-pound bomb cannons
- 4x 18-pound cannons

The crew consisted of 91 artillerymen from the Schleswig-Holstein 5th Fortress Artillery Regiment.

== Battle ==
At 07:30 on the morning of April 5, the Danish squadron sailed into Eckernfördeviken. The bombing of the German batteries began immediately and the northern fortress was soon put out. Suddenly, the wind increased in strength and drove frigate Gefion away from its place in the Danish battle line. When Geiser tried to tow the frigate back, the steamer was subjected to murderous firing from the remaining battery. A hit knocked out Geiser's steam engine and left the ship unmaneuverable.

Soon, Christian VIII also came out of position, and when Hekla tried to save the liner, she was also seriously damaged by the concentrated attack by the Germans. The strong wind prevented the sailing ships from getting out of the bay and Paludan asked for a ceasefire. During the ceasefire, the Danes made an unsuccessful attempt to move their ships to safety. The fighting resumed at 17:30 and Gefion was soon forced to fly the white flag. Despite the violent bombardment, the crew of Christian VIII continued to resist. Paludan, however, soon realized that continued combat was pointless and ordered the ship to be abandoned.

During the evacuation, a fire broke out on board and firefighting attempts by the crew failed. A German non-commissioned officer boarded and demanded that the wounded crew members remain on the ship and that its gunpowder stock not be emptied. Paludan protested with reference to the fire on board, but was eventually forced to agree to the Germans' demands to surrender. Despite this, he still ordered that the gunpowder be thrown overboard. However, the order came late as the fire spread across the ship at a rapid pace. At 20:00, Christian VIII exploded. Most of those on board, including many wounded, died immediately from the explosion. Paludan watched the shipwreck from ashore.

== Aftermath ==
The attack cost the Danes dearly. Two ships had been lost and over 1,100 sailors had either been killed, wounded or captured, including the Danish naval officer Christian Krieger, who commanded the steamship Geiser and died after the gunpowder exploded underneath the deck. The Schleswig-Holstein losses were lighter with only 4 dead and 14 wounded.

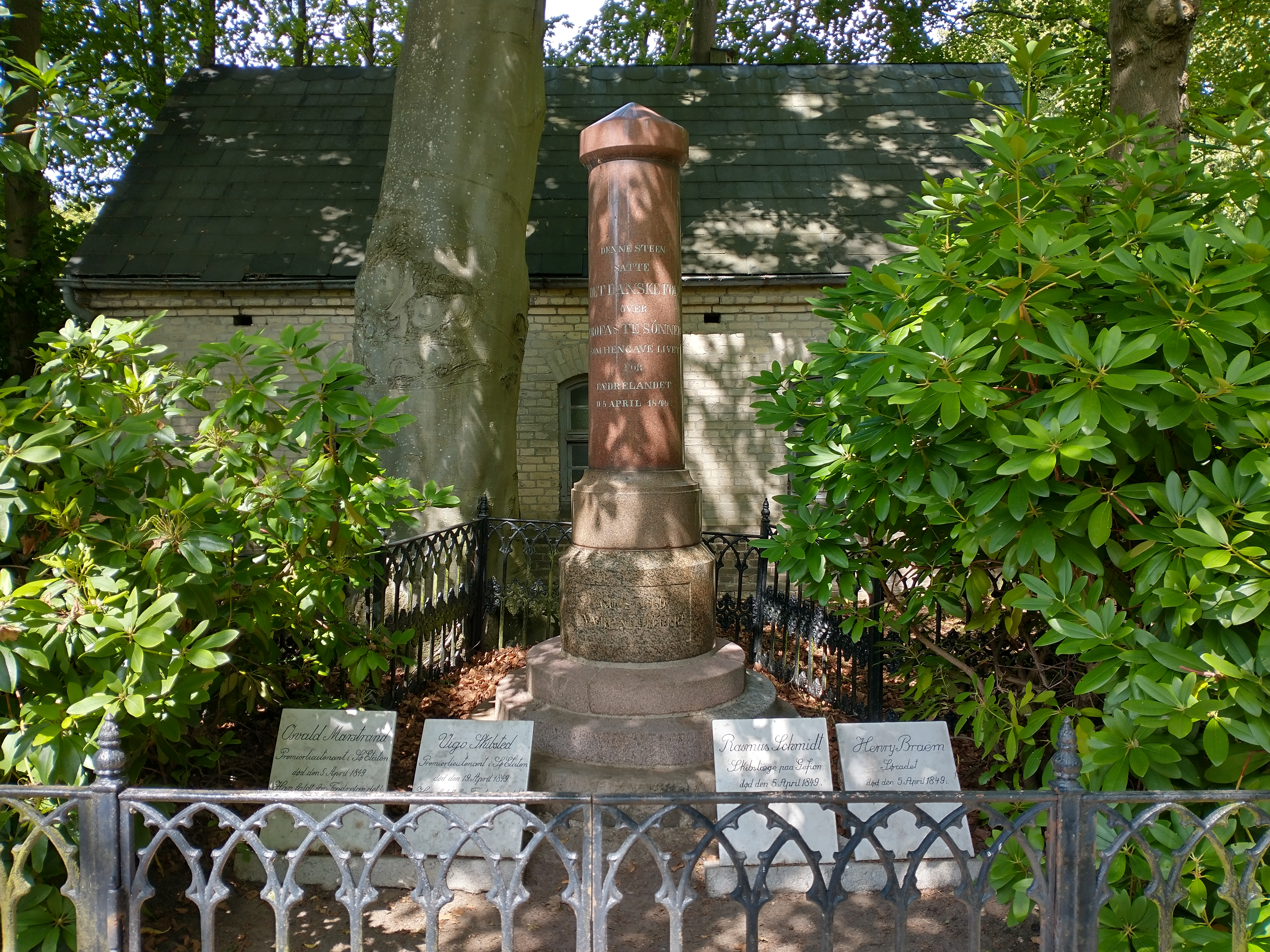
Danish soldier's grave in the Mühlenberg (Møllebjerg) cemetery in Eckernförde (Egernførde, Egernfjord)

== In fiction ==
The battle makes an appearance early in the novel We, the Drowned by Danish author Carsten Jensen.
