= Hermann von Beckerath =

Prussian banker and statesman (1801–1870)

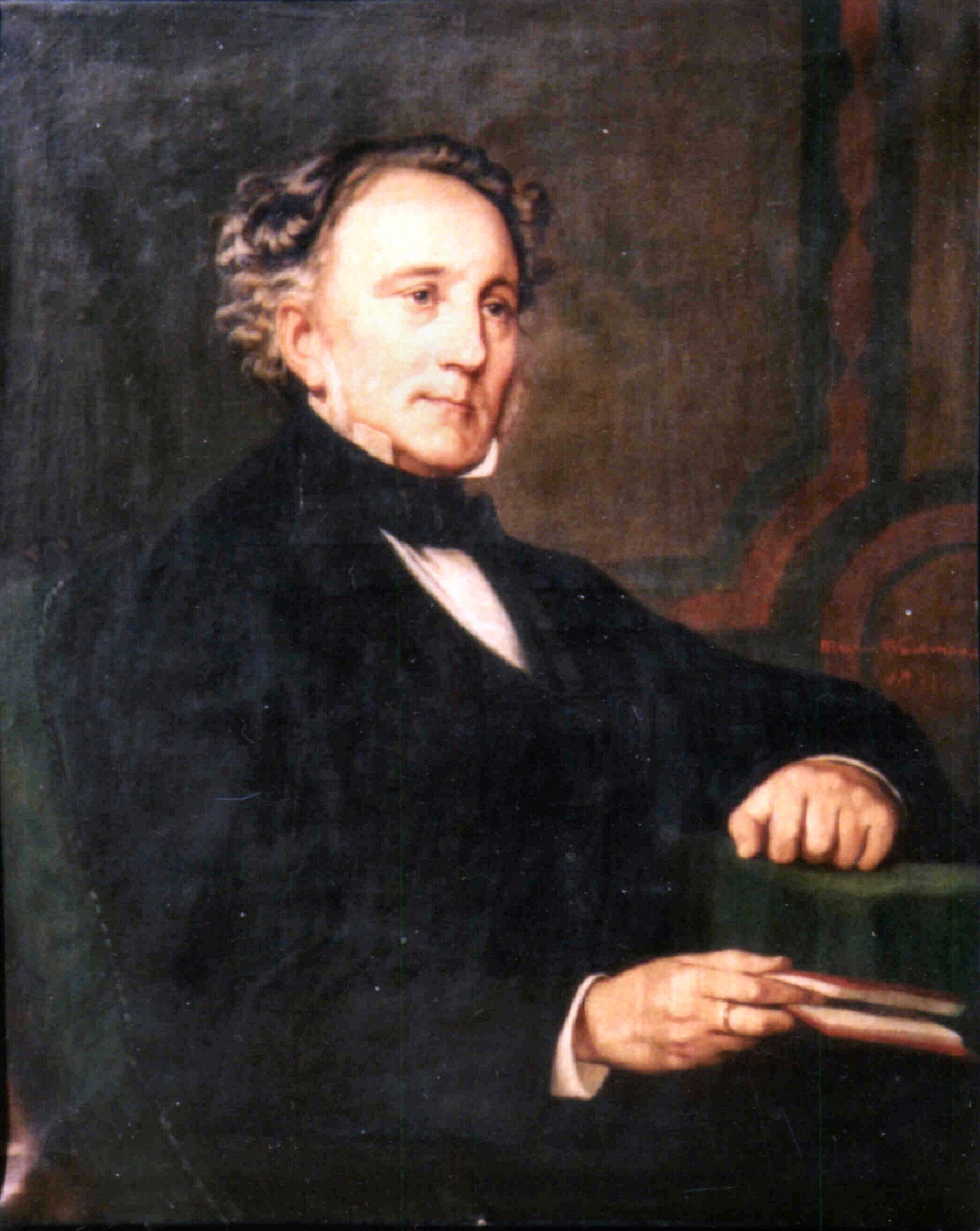
- Hermann von Beckerath.
- Born: 13 December 1801; Krefeld, Rhenish Prussia
- Died: 12 May 1870 (aged 68); Krefeld, Rhenish Prussia
- Occupations: Banker, Prussian statesman
- Known for: Advocacy for German unity and political liberty

Hermann von Beckerath (13 December 1801 in Krefeld – 12 May 1870 also in Krefeld) was a banker and Prussian statesman.

== Biography ==
He was born at Krefeld, in Rhenish Prussia. His youth was spent in learning the business of banking, after which he became the head of a banking firm which had considerable influence in German financing, especially in the Rhenish provinces. After acquiring a considerable fortune, he turned his attention to politics. He served in the Diet of his province and in the Prussian Diet of 1847, and went as a deputy to the Frankfurt Parliament of 1848, where he was an unswerving advocate of German unity and political liberty. His eloquence exercised considerable influence on this assembly. He was appointed Minister of Finance in the ministry constituted for Germany under the auspices of the parliament, and presently was called to Berlin to construct a cabinet. He declined the task because Frederick William IV, the king, would not give him a free hand in his scheme for the unification of Germany.

When the reactionary movement set in, he resigned the posts he held under the government, but continued, as a member of the Prussian Second Chamber, a vigorous opposition to the Manteuffel ministry, which had deserted the cause of German unity. He withdrew from politics in 1852. After the departure of Manteuffel from power in 1858, Beckerath was again elected a member of the Prussian Second Chamber, but was obliged to decline the honor on account of failing health. He devoted his later years to the affairs of Krefeld, his native town.
