= Karl Rudolf Brommy =

German naval officer

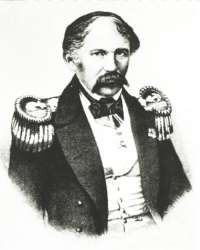
Karl Rudolf Brommy

German Reichsflotte flag

Rear Admiral Karl Rudolf Brommy (changed his name to reflect the English pronunciation of his original name, Bromme) (10 September 1804 – 9 January 1860) was a German naval officer who helped establish the first unified German fleet, the Reichsflotte, during the First Schleswig War which broke out just before the Revolutions of 1848 in the German states.

A skilled sea commander, Brommy also made significant contributions to German naval education and shore infrastructure.

== Early life and career ==
Born Karl Rudolf Bromme in Anger (now part of Leipzig), in the Electorate of Saxony, he was the fifth child of Johann Simon Bromme and his wife, Louise; he was orphaned while still a child. In 1818, the youth received permission from his guardian to become a sailor; he studied at the navigational school in Hamburg and made his first sea voyage on the brig Heinrich. Eventually, he served on various United States sailing vessels. During this time, the young man altered the spelling of his name to “Brommy,” to match the English pronunciation.

=== Service in South American and Greek revolutions ===
In 1820, during a stay on the western coast of South America, Brommy enlisted as a midshipman in the Chilean Navy, at the time when it was led by British nobleman Lord Cochrane, the former Royal Navy officer who had achieved distinction in the Napoleonic Wars. Cochrane undertook the education of young Brommy, so that the youth was soon fit to take on his first command: the 18-gun brigantine Maypo. Brommy took part in several actions in Chile's War of Independence against the Spanish including the capture of Valdivia. When Brazil became an independent empire in 1822, Cochrane left Chile in order to develop a Brazilian fleet. Brommy followed him, remaining in Brazilian service until 1825.

From 1827 to 1828, Cochrane led the Greek war fleet in the Greek War of Independence against the Turks and Egyptians. Brommy also followed him to Greece, now with the rank of Lieutenant Commander. He was initially first officer of the 64-gun frigate Hellas (formerly Hope), then second in command of the corvette Hydra.

On June 11, 1828, Brommy was advanced to the rank of Commander, and given command of the modern steam corvette Epicheiresis (the former Enterprise). In the squadron of Greek admiral Andreas Vokos Miaoulis, Brommy took part in the battles in the Gulf of Arta, and participated in the recapture of Missolonghi. In 1829, during the turmoils of the third Greek civil war, Miaoulis and Brommy supported the bourgeois camp. Soon, however, Brommy left Greece and returned to Saxony. In Meissen, he published an autobiographical novel under the pseudonym R. Termo.

In 1832, the Bavarian prince Otto von Wittelsbac became King of Greece. The King was conducted to his new realm by a Greek delegation under Admiral Miaoulis; Brommy attached himself to this delegation, and became an officer in the Greek Navy. He was named commander of various warships, harbor master of Piraeus, and head of the admiralty court. Later he became first commandant of the naval school in Piraeus. In 1845 Brommy requested the Prussian King Frederick William IV for transfer into the Prussian navy, but this request was denied.

== Organizing the first German Navy ==
Following the revolutionary events of 1848, the cry became louder in all German states for the creation of a purely German navy (Deutsche Marine), which was founded on 4 June 1848 as the Reichsflotte. In a letter of July 23, 1848 to Heinrich von Gagern, President of the Frankfurt National Assembly, Brommy offered his help in building up a German fleet. In a reply of November 4, 1848, he was directed by Commerce Minister Duckwitz to come to Frankfurt am Main, where Brommy arrived at the end of the year.

At first, Brommy worked in Maritime Technical Commission of the Assembly's naval department (Marineabteilung). After the department's head, Prince Adalbert of Prussia, was removed from this position by the King of Prussia, Brommy took over the office.

On March 18, 1849, Brommy became Commander-in-Chief of the North Sea Flotilla with his flagship Barbarossa in Brake, Lower Saxony. The seaport of Brake became at this time the provisional naval base of the first German fleet. Brommy undertook the military fortification of this base by means of the Hamburg flotilla.

In 1849, in Berlin, Brommy published his “Naval Handbook” (Lehrbuch der Marine) – an easy-to-understand manual for educating all levels of seamen.

=== The Battle of Heligoland (1849) ===
At the beginning of the war against Denmark (the "First Schleswig War"), Brommy (now promoted to post-captain (Kapitän zur See) became head of the naval depot in Bremerhaven, that served as arsenal for the growing fleet. Despite material, personal, and financial problems, Brommy succeeded in establishing a small fleet for the war against Denmark. This fleet was initially comprised nine seaworthy steamships, two sailing vessels, and 27 gunboats (Ruderkanonenboote). Due to a shortage of native personnel, Brommy was forced to fill the ranks of the higher officers largely with Britons and Belgians.

The only wartime action of the German fleet under Brommy, the Battle of Heligoland (1849) against the Danes ended on June 4, 1849, with the breaking off of battle before the then-British territory of Heligoland, in order to prevent a conflict with Great Britain.

=== Promotion to flag rank ===
On November 23, 1849, the "Provisional Central Authorities" established by the Frankfurt Parliament appointed Brommy to flag rank, as a Rear Admiral. The appointment was made by Archduke John of Austria (1782–1859), the imperial regent (Reichsverweser).

=== Disestablishment of the fleet ===
In the following days, Brommy was further busied with the development of the fleet, but found himself opposed by the reactionary ruling powers. In 1850, the German Confederation was reestablished. Yet on April 2, 1852, the Federal Diet of the German Confederation in Frankfurt am Main, at the insistence of Prussia, disestablished the first German fleet in Brake. Lorenz Hannibal Fischer was the politician appointed as federal commissioner to oversee the naval disestablishment.

Into this situation Brommy threw himself, to defend colleagues and subordinates who were threatened with dismissal. The ships of the fleet were sold in the same year, most of them at less than their true value. Two modern ships were taken over by Prussia. On March 31, 1853, Brommy signed the dissolution order. So on April 1, with the disestablishment of all naval authorities, and the release of the personnel still in service, thus ended the history of the first German navy.

At this difficult time in his life, Brommy found personal happiness with his marriage to Caroline Gross, the daughter of a merchant and hotel owner of Brake.

Rear Admiral Brommy took his departure on June 30, 1853. From the German Confederation he received a one-time payment of 2,500 Taler. A short time later he was given a monthly pension of 125 Taler for the duration of his unemployment. His offer of service to the Prussian Navy was turned down.

== Later career and death ==
In June 1857 Brommy took a position as technical adviser in the Austro-Hungarian Navy in Venice, but was forced to give up the position after a few months due to poor health. Disappointed, he returned with his wife and son to Germany and settled in St. Magnus near Bremen, where he died on January 9, 1860. Covered with the black-red-gold flag of his flagship Barbarossa, Brommy's coffin was carried on the steamship Merkur to the cemetery of the village Kirchhammelwarden (today a district of Brake) for burial.

== Legacy ==
In 1916, the Imperial German Navy built the Brommy, a convoy ship [Räumbootbegleitschiff], in honor of the admiral. 10.09.2024 Renaming of the Marineoffiziersschule (MOS) Bremerhaven to Admiral Brommy kaserne
