= August Giacomo Jochmus =

August Giacomo Jochmus, Freiherr von Cotignola
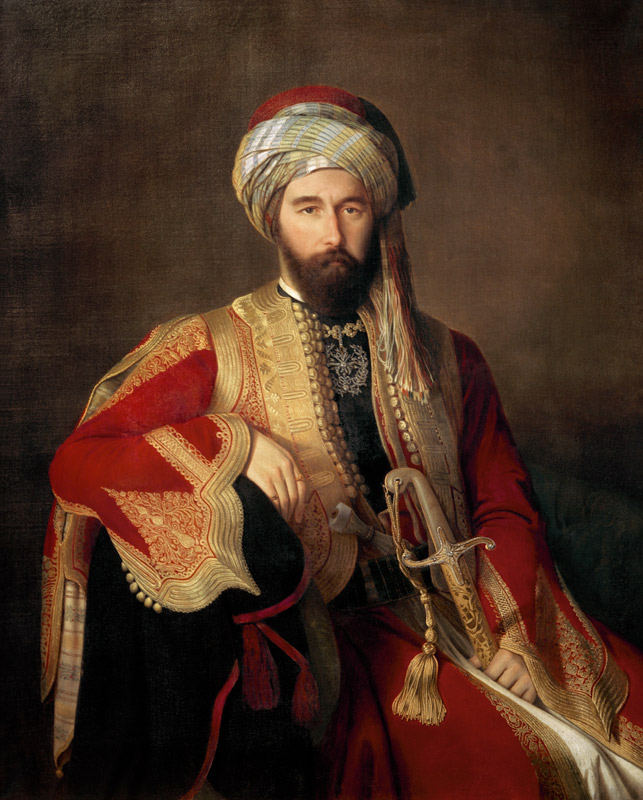
- Born: February 27, 1808; Hamburg
- Died: September 14, 1881 (aged 73) Bamberg
- Allegiance: Austrian Empire (Turkey) Ottoman Empire; First Hellenic Republic
- Branch: Army
- Rank: Lieutenant Field Marshal
- Conflicts: Greek War of Independence; First Carlist War, Ottoman–Egyptian War

August Giacomo Jochmus (after 1859:) Freiherr von Cotignola (February 27, 1808, in Hamburg, Germany – September 14, 1881, in Bamberg, Germany) was an Austrian lieutenant field marshal, and minister of the German Confederation. He spent his life in Greek, English, Spanish and Turkish service, was briefly foreign minister and navy minister of the Frankfurt Parliament of the German Confederation in 1849 and finished his career as an Austrian lieutenant field marshal.

== Life ==
Jochmus first went to Paris to study military science and went to Greece in 1827, at the age of 19, where he took part in the Greek struggle for liberation as an aide-de-camp to General Richard Church. He was a captain by the age of 20 and then worked as a general staff officer in the Greek Ministry of War.

Angered by National Party intrigues, he went to England in 1835, from where he went to Spain with the British-Spanish Foreign Legion. Here he was appointed chief of staff to the quartermaster general, promoted to brigadier general in 1837 and finally chief of an army corps.

After the end of the civil war, he returned to England in 1838, from where Lord Palmerston soon sent him to Constantinople to prepare for the war against Syria. In 1840, Jochmus was promoted from the Sublime Porte to division general. He then served as chief of staff of the combined Turkish-British-Austrian armies fighting the insurgent Muhammad Ali Pasha of Egypt in the capture of St Jean d'Acre in November 1840. The participating Austrian contingent was under the command of Vice Admiral Archduke Friedrich. In December 1840, he took over the supreme command of the Turkish army and after the end of the campaign in February 1841, he was employed in the Turkish Ministry of War. Appointed Turkish general of division and pasha with two horsetails, he served in the Turkish Ministry of War until 1848.

The March Revolution of 1848 finally called him back to Germany. Reichsverweser Archduke Johann of Austria appointed him foreign and navy minister. After the Archduke's resignation and the dissolution of the Reich Ministry in December 1849, Jochmus withdrew into private life.

Eventually, he settled in Austria, where his son Carlos (1842–1914) attended the cadet school in Hainburg and the Theresian Military Academy. At first he tried in vain to be accepted into the Austrian army. In 1859, Jochmus was designated by the Austrian government for use in the war, but was no longer active. After the armistice of Villafranca, the emperor raised him to the status of baron with the title "of Cotignola". In the war year 1866, he succeeded in taking over as field marshal lieutenant. Because of the rapid end of the war with Prussia, however, he was no longer able to serve in the war.
