= Arnold Duckwitz =

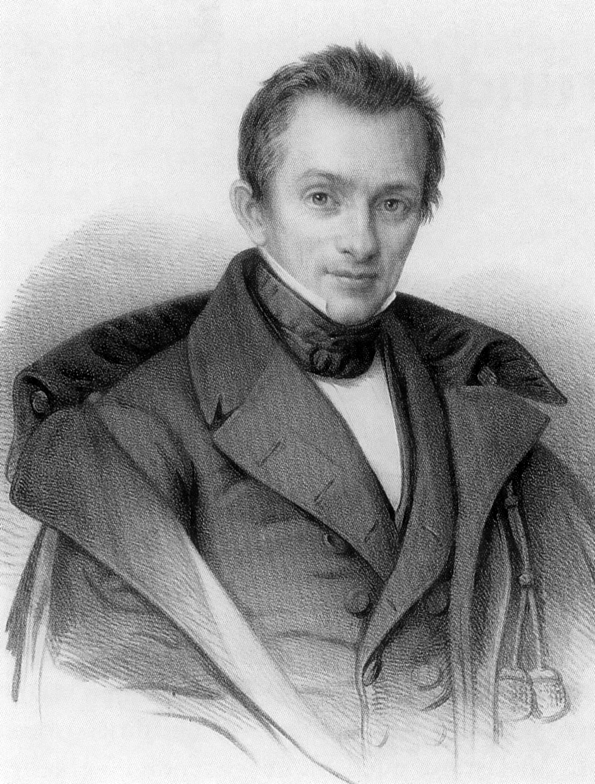
A contemporary portrait of Arnold Duckwitz

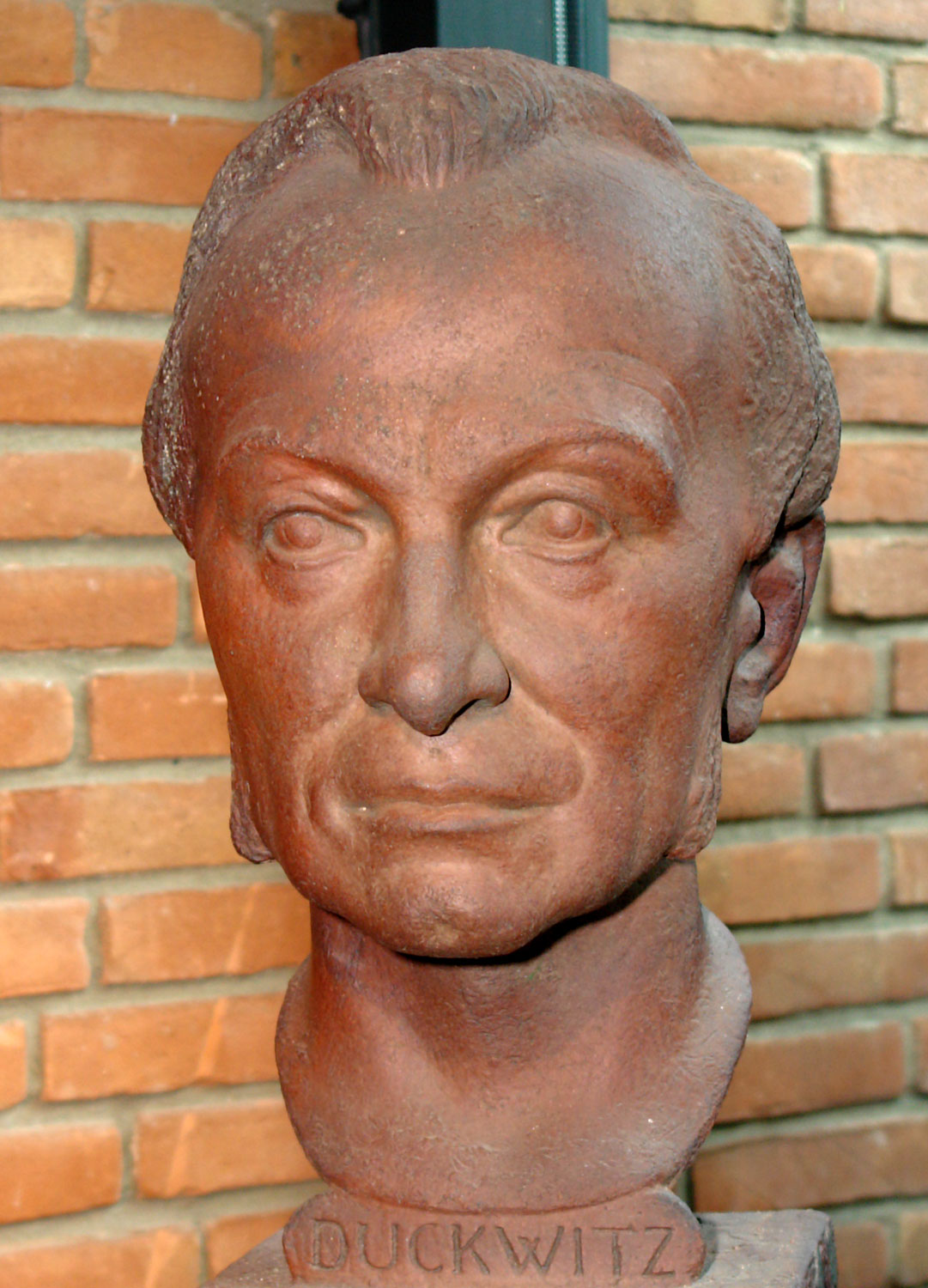
A bust of Duckwitz

Arnold Duckwitz (27 January 1802 in Bremen Germany – 19 March 1881 in Bremen) was a German statesman and merchant who served as Minister of Trade and of the Navy in the provisional government of the Frankfurt Assembly of 1848–49, and as mayor of Bremen.

From early to mid-1848, he participated as an expert in the economic committee of the Frankfurt National Assembly. As Commissioner of Bremen he advised on German trade relations. Subsequently, he was in July 1848 appointed Reich Minister for Trade (Reichsminister für Handel) of the all-Germany 'Provisional Central Power' (Provisorische Zentralgewalt), headed by Archduke John of Austria as regent (Reichsverweser). He later became also Minister for Navy Affairs (Minister für Marineangelegenheiten). He managed to create in a short time a small navy (Reichsseewehr or Reichsflotte) for limited use in the Second Schleswig War (1849) against the superior Danish fleet.

He was also a city senator (Bremer Senats) from 1841 and mayor of the Hanseatic city of Bremen 1857–1863, and 1866–1869. He was then a city senator until he retired in 1875.
