= Reichsflotte =

Imperial Fleet Reichsflotte (RF)
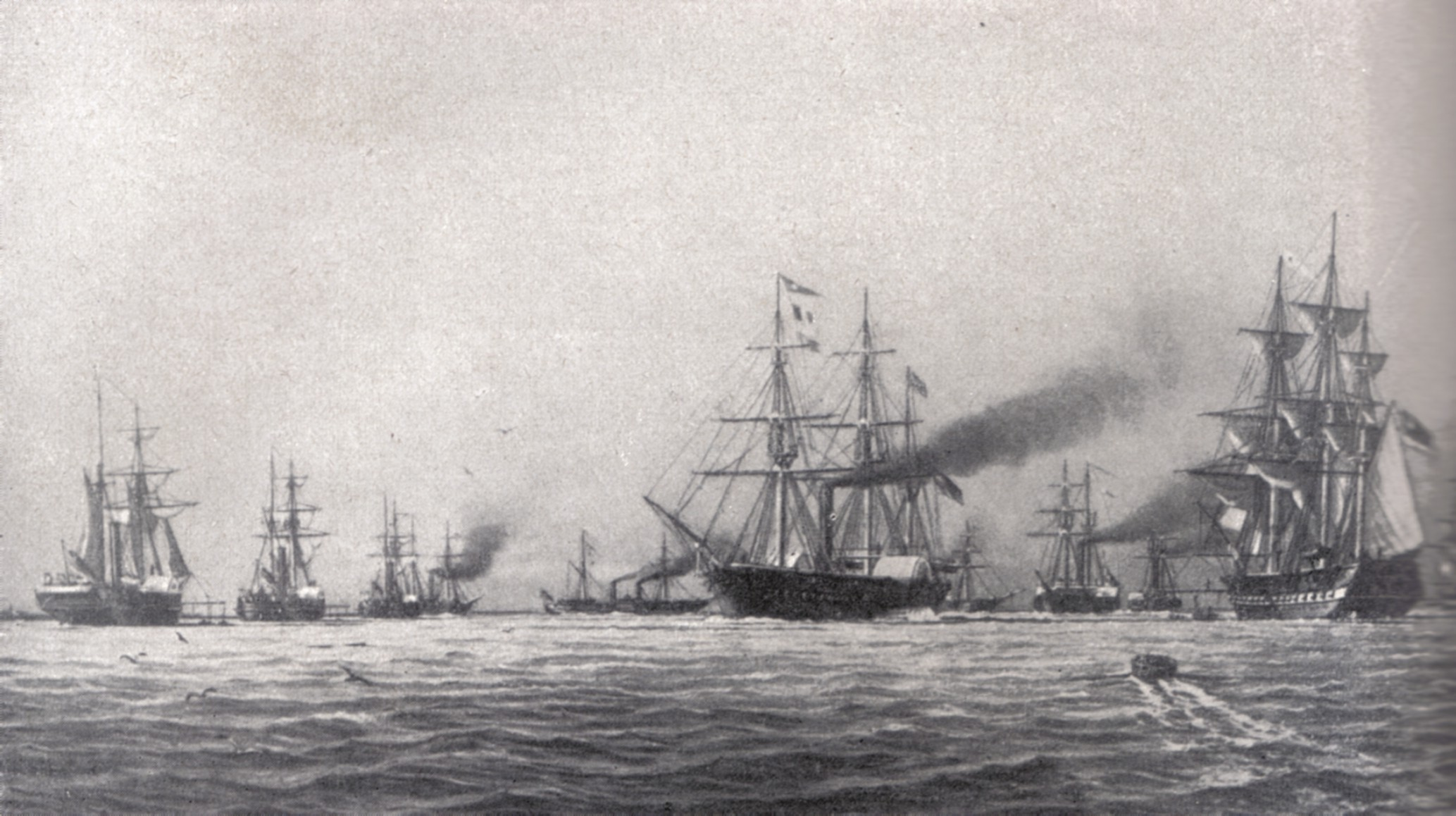
- Ships of the Reichsflotte in 1849
- Active: 1848–1852
- Disbanded: 2 April 1852
- Country: German Empire (1848/1849); German Confederation
- Allegiance: Provisorische Zentralgewalt
- Type: Navy
- Role: Naval warfare
- Size: 39 ships
- H/Q: Brake, Oldenburg
- Engagements: Schleswig War (1848–1851)

Commanders
- Navy Minister: August Jochmus
- Rear Admiral: Karl Brommy

Insignia
- War Ensign (1848–1852)

- Naval Jack (1848–1852)

The Reichsflotte (German: [ˈʁaɪçsˌflɔtə], Imperial Fleet) was the first navy for all of Germany, established by the revolutionary German Empire to provide a naval force in the First Schleswig War against Denmark. The decision was made on 14 June 1848 by the Frankfurt Parliament, which is considered by the modern German Navy as its birthday.

In December 1849 the imperial government was replaced by a federal commission. In 1851 the German Confederation was fully re-established. The German states such as Prussia, Hanover and Austria had a quarrel regarding the ships and the costs to sustain a fleet. In 1852 the Confederation decided to dissolve the fleet and sell the ships.

== History ==
The German Confederation, founded in 1815, was initially not in need of a navy, as it could rely on three members who commanded large fleets: The Grand Duke of Luxembourg (the King of the Netherlands) as commander of the Royal Dutch Navy, the Duke of Holstein as the commander of the Danish Navy, and last but not least, the King of Hanover as commander of the British Royal Navy. This had changed by the late 1830s, as the Kings of the Netherlands and Great Britain ceased to be members of the German Confederation, and in early 1848 Denmark also turned against Germany in the First Schleswig War. Soon, the Danish Navy stopped all German trade in the North Sea and the Baltic Sea.

This newly created provisional government was headed by Archduke John of Austria as regent (Reichsverweser); he named August von Jochmus as Foreign Minister and Navy minister.

The parliament first met in Frankfurt on 18 May 1848, and on 12 June 1848 the diet of the German Confederation turned over its budget to the parliament. Only two days later, the parliament decided to spend six million Reichsthaler on a navy to be under the command of Prince Adalbert of Prussia. When he had to resign due to an order by the King of Prussia, Konteradmiral Karl Rudolf Brommy took over.

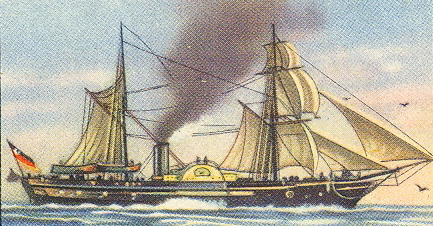
SMS Barbarossa in 1849

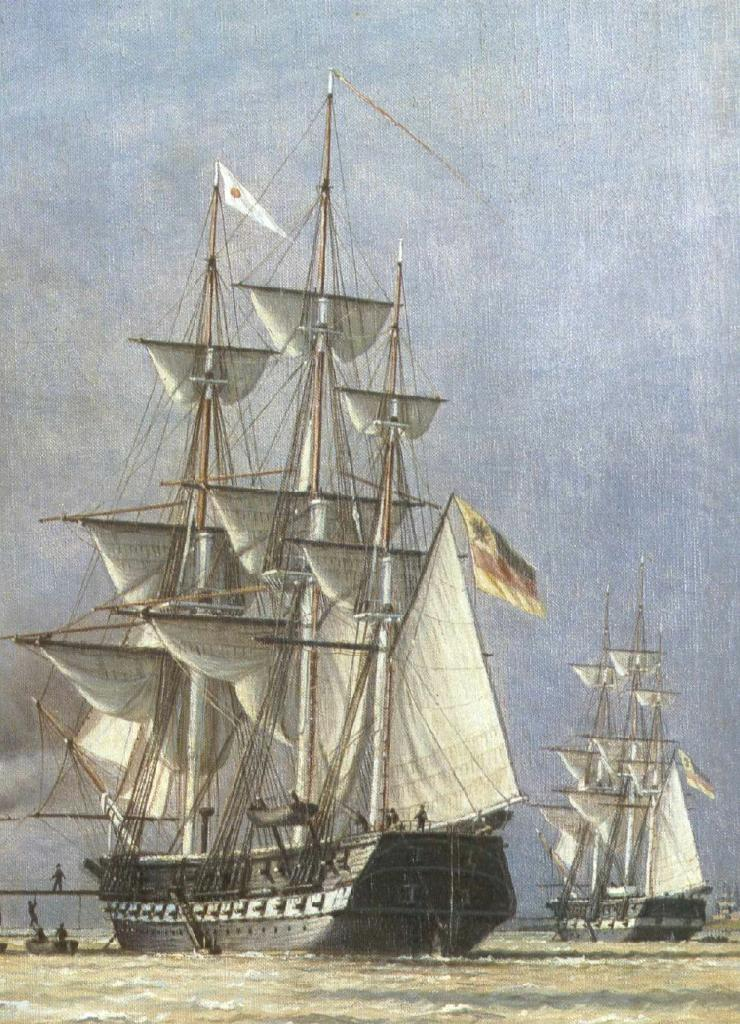
SMS Eckernförde (left), & SMS Deutschland (right) in 1849

In the Battle of Heligoland of 4 June 1849, the fleet under Brommy saw its only sea battle, which also remains the first and only naval combat under the black-red-gold flag of Germany. The battle, involving five vessels altogether, was inconclusive, with no losses on either side, but after it the Danish blockade was restored.

Until 1852, the fleet had

- Two sail frigates:
  - SMS Deutschland[de]
  - SMS Eckernförde (the captured Danish ship SMS Gefion)
- Three steam frigates:
  - SMS Barbarossa (formerly RMS Britannia)
  - SMS Erzherzog Johann[de]
  - SMS Hansa[de]
- One sail corvette:
  - Franklin (donated by Hamburg, not accepted)
- Six steam corvettes:
  - SMS Der Königliche Ernst August[de]
  - SMS Großherzog von Oldenburg[de]
  - SMS Frankfurt (1848)[de]
  - SMS Bremen[de]
  - SMS Hamburg[de]
  - SMS Lübeck[de]
- 27 gunboats
- One submarine:
  - Brandtaucher

The ships became the property of the re-established German Confederation, via the Bundeszentralkommission of 1849-1851 that dealt with the tasks of the former Central Power of the Imperial Regent. An argument arose as to whether the fleet was an 'organic institution' of the Confederation or simply a property. The majority of the Bundestag argued that it was just a property so that a decision about it did not need unanimity.

On 2 April 1852, the Reichsflotte was dissolved. While most ships were sold off, two of the steam frigates were given to the Prussian Navy, which later evolved into the North German Federal Navy (1867-1871) and that then became the Imperial German Navy (1872-1918).

== Names ==
Several names are used for this Navy. The resolution of 14 June 1848 just calls it "Deutsche Marine", while navy minister Arnold Duckwitz in 1849 reported about the "Deutsche Kriegsmarine" and when Karl Rudolf Brommy was promoted to its first Admiral, the name used was Reichsmarine, which was used within the Navy, too. To avoid confusion with later incarnations, historians settled for Reichsflotte.

The term Bundesflotte (Federal Fleet) is also used, but this is misleading, as it was not operated by the German Confederation in its first years. Bundesflotte was also the name of an Austrian-Prussian naval project in 1865. The modern German navy since 1956 was called the Bundesmarine but now uses the name Deutsche Marine.

The "Verfassung des Deutschen Reichs", article III § 19, states:

[1] The naval forces are the exclusive affair of the Reich. It is not allowed for any single state to maintain its own warships or hire privateers.
[2] The crews of the war navy are a part of the new German defence force (the term Wehrmacht is used). They are independent of the land forces.
[3] The size of the crews to be provided for the war navy from each state, is to be calculated from the number of land forces to be maintained by it. Details on this matter, as well as the balancing of costs between the Reich government and the individual states, will be determined by law.
[4] The commissioning of officers and officials of the naval forces are under the sole authority of the Reich.
[5] The care for equipping, training and maintaining a war fleet and the creation, equipping and maintenance of military harbours and arsenals falls under the authority of the Reich.
[6] The matters pertaining to the appropriations necessary for the establishment of military harbours and naval installations, as well as to the responsibilities of the corresponding Reich services will be determined by Reich laws.

== Literature ==
- Guntram Schulze-Wegener: Deutschland zur See . 150 Jahre Marinegeschichte. Mittler, Hamburg 1998. ISBN 3-8132-0551-7
- Jörg Duppler : Germania auf dem Meere / Bilder und Dokumente zur Deutschen Marinegeschichte 1848 –1998. Mittler, Hamburg 1998. ISBN 3-8132-0564-9
- Walther Hubatsch: Die erste deutsche Flotte, 1848 - 1853, Mittler, Herford 1981.
- L[üder]. Arenhold: Vor 50 Jahren: Die Deutsche Reichsflotte 1848 - 1852 in zwölf Bildern, (Reprint from 1906) Media Verlag, Berlin 1995.
