= List of members of the Frankfurt Parliament =

On 18 May 1848, elected deputies of the Frankfurt National Assembly gathered in the Kaisersaal and walked solemnly to the Paulskirche to hold the first session of the new Parliament, under its chairman (by seniority) Friedrich Lang. Then, Heinrich Gagern of Wiesbaden was elected president of the parliament.

The total number of sitting deputies at any given time would vary considerably during the life of the National Assembly. Sittings were regular, yet many deputies failed to appear, protested various sittings, were replaced by proxies, or removed from the sittings. In total, there were 809 deputies between 18 May 1848 and the forcible closure of the Rump Parliament on 18 June 1849.

The following 379 deputies were recorded in attendance in the first sitting of the National Assembly on 18 May 1848:

== A ==
Member name	City or district represented	State of origin
Achleitner, Georg	Ried	Austria
Adams, Franz	Coblenz (Rhineland)	Prussia
Ahrens, Heinrich	Salzgitter	Hanover
Anders, Friedrich	Jauer (Goldberg in Silesia)	Prussia
Anderson, Ferdinand	Frankfurt a.d. Oder	Prussia
Philipp Ludwig Adam	Ulm	Württemberg
Andrian-Werburg, Victor Franz v.	Vienna (Wiener Neustadt)	Austria
Arnim-Boytzenburg, Adolf Heinrich v.	Berlin	Prussia
Auersperg, Anton Alexander v.	Vienna	Austria

== B ==
Member name	City or district represented	State of origin
Barth, Marquard Adolf	Kaufbeuren	Bavaria
Bassermann, Friedrich Daniel	Mannheim	Baden
Becker, Friedrich Gottlieb	Gotha	Saxe-Coburg and Gotha
Becker, Christoph	Daan (Schönecken) (Rhineland)	Prussia
Beckerath, Hermann v.	Crefeld (Westphalia)	Prussia
Behr, Wilhelm Josef	Bamberg	Bavaria
Beinhauer, Wilhelm	Waidhofen	Austria
Bernhardi, Karl	Kassel (Eschwege)	Electoral Hesse
Biedermann, Karl	Dresden	Saxony
Blum, Robert	Leipzig	Saxony
Blumenstetter, Josef	Burladingen	Hohenzollern-Hechingen
Blumröder, August v.	Sondershausen	Schwarzburg-Sondershausen
Blumröder, Gustav v.	Kirchenlamitz	Bavaria
Böcler, Heinrich	Schwerin	Mecklenburg-Schwerin
Bogen, Ludwig	Michelstadt	Grand Ducal Hesse
Bonardy, Ludwig	Greiz	Reuss ältere Linie
Bouvier, Cajetan	Gonobitz (Styria)	Austria
Bothmer, Karl v.	Carow (Blumenau)	Hanover
Bresgen, Franz	Ahrweiler (Rhineland)	Prussia
Briegleb, Moritz Adolf	Coburg	Saxe-Coburg and Gotha
Britlev (likely Brieglieb, Moritz Adolf, due to stenographer error)	(unknown)	
Brons, Ysaak	Emden	Hanover
Brunck, Josef	Fürfeld	Grand Ducal Hesse
Bürgers, Ignaz	Cologne (Rhineland)	Prussia
Burkart, Friedrich Carl	Bamberg	Bavaria
Buttel, Diedrich Christian	Oldenburg	Oldenburg
Buzzi, Andreas v.	Klagenfurt (Carinthia)	Austria

== C ==
Member name	City or district represented	State of origin
Carl, Heinrich Conrad	Berlin	Prussia
Cetto, Karl Philipp	Sankt Wendel (Rhineland)	Prussia
Claussen, Hans Reimer	Heide	Schleswig-Holstein
Clemens, Franz Jacob	Bonn (Rhineland)	Prussia
Cnyrim, Adolf	Frankfurt (Ziegenhain)), Rhineland	Prussia
Compes, Gerhard	Cologne (Rhineland)	Prussia
Cramer, Andreas	Cörben	Anhalt-Köthen
Cucumus, Konrad	Munich	Bavaria

== D ==
Member name	City or district represented	State of origin
Dahlmann, Friedrich Christoph	Bonn (Rhineland)	Prussia
Dallwitz, Sigmund v.	Lauban (Silesia)	Prussia
Dammers, Carl Otto	Nienburg	Hanover
Deetz, Albert August Wilhelm	Wittenberg (Province of Saxony)	Prussia
Degenkolb, Carl	Eulenburg (Delitzsch)	Saxony
Deiters, Peter Franz Ignz	Bonn (Rhineland)	Prussia
Detmold, Johann Hermann	Hanover	Hanover
Dewes, Peter	Losheim (Merzig) (Rhineland)	Prussia
Deymann, Matthias	Meppen	Hanover
Dham, Carl Johann Ludwig	Schmallenberg (Meschede) (Westphalia)	Prussia
Ditsch (Dietzsch), Ferdinand	Saarbrücken (Rhineland)	Prussia
Dietzsch, Carl Theodor	Annaberg (Schwarzenberg)	Saxony
Dobblhof-Diers, Joseph v.	Baden	Austria
Döllinger, Ignaz	Munich (Landau)	Bavaria
Drinkwelder, Franz	Krems	Austria
Dröge, Johann Albert	Bremen	
Droysen, Johann Gustav	Kiel (Oldenburg in Holstein)	Schleswig-Holstein
Dunker (Duncker), Maximilian	Halle (Province of Saxony)	Prussia

== E ==
Member name	City or district represented	State of origin
Ebmeier, Carl Heinrich	Paderborn (Westphalia)	Prussia
Eckert, Eduard	Bromberg (Posen)	Prussia
Eckert, Nicolaus Joseph	Lohr (Gemünden)	Bavaria
Edlauer, Franz	Liezen (Styria)	Austria
Egger, Franz	Vienna	Austria
Eisenmann, Gottfried	Würzburg	Bavaria
Englmayr, Georg	Leonbach (Enns)	Austria
Esmarch, Heinrich Carl	Husum	Schleswig-Holstein
Evertsbusch, Friedrich	Altenau	Hanover
Eymuth, Franz	Murau (Styria)	Austria

== F ==
Member name	City or district represented	State of origin
Falk, Friedrich Wilhelm Alexander	Oberlangendorf (Militsch) (Silesia)	Prussia
Fallmerayer, Jakob Phillip	Munich	Bavaria
Fetzer, Carl August Friedrich	Stuttgart	Württemberg
Flir, Alois	Landeck (Tyrol)	Austria
Flottwell, Eduard v.	Münster (Westphalia)	Prussia
Fischer, Gustav	Jena	Saxe-Weimar-Eisenach
Frank, Mortiz v.	Graz (Styria)	Austria
Francke, Karl	Flensburg	Schleswig-Holstein
Freudentheil, Gottlieb Wilhelm	Frankfurt	
Friedrich, Leonhard	Bamberg	Bavaria
Frisch, Christian	Stuttgart	Württemberg
Fritsch, Johann	Ried	Austria
Fuchs, Carl	Breslau (Silesia)	Prussia
Förster, Johann Adam	Gelnhausen (Hessen)	Hesse-Kassel
Fügerl, Karl	Korneuburg	Austria

== G ==
Member name	City or district represented	State of origin
Gagern, Maximilian v.	Wiesbaden	Nassau
Gagern, Heinrich v.	Darmstadt	Grand Ducal Hesse
Gans, Carl Theodor Edler Herr zu Putlitz	Putlitz (Brandenburg)	Prussia
Gangkofner, Carl Josef	Pottenstein	Bavaria
Gasser, Vincenz	Brixen (Tyrol)	Austria
Gebhardt, Conrad	Fürth	Bavaria
Gebhardt, Heinrich	Hof	Bavaria
Geigel, Phillip	Munich	Bavaria
Genzken, Friedrich	Neustrelitz	Mecklenburg-Strelitz
Gervinus, Georg Gottfried	Heidelberg	Baden
Gevekoht, Carl Theodor	Bremen	
Giesebrecht, Ludwig	Mirow in Pommern	Prussia
Glaß, Maximilian	Landau	Bavaria
Glück, Christian Carl	Munich	Bavaria
Gold, Carl Ritter v.	Adelsberg (Carniola)	Austria
Goltz, Robert v. d. (mayor of Brieg)	Brieg (Silesia)	Prussia
Goltz, Gustav Graf v. d.	Czarnikau (Posen)	Prussia
Gombart, Ludwig Lucas	Munich	Bavaria
Graf, Johann Baptist Eduard	Munich	Bavaria
Grävell, Maximilian Karl Friedrich Wilhelm	Muskau (Lusatia)	Prussia
Groß, Carl	Leer	Hanover
Gritzner, Maximilian Josef	Vienna	Austria
Grimmert, Carl Friedrich	Mehringen	Anhalt-Dessau
Grindlinger (Gründlinger), Michael	Wolfpassing	Austria
Groß, Carl	Leer	Hanover
Grumbrecht, August	Lüneburg	Hanover
Grundner, Georg v.	Ingolstadt	Bavaria
Günther, Georg	Leipzig	Saxony
Gulden, Gustav Adolf	Zweibrücken (Rhineland)	Prussia

== H ==
Member name	City or district represented	State of origin
Hagenmüller, Johann Baptiste	Kempten	Bavaria
Hagenow, Gustav v.	Langenfelde (Grimmen) (Pomerania)	Prussia
Hahn, Johann Friedrich	Ringleben	Saxony
Hartmann, Moritz	Litoměřice (Bohemia)	Austria
Haßler, Konrad Dietrich	Ulm	Württemberg
Haßlwenter, Johann	Innsbruck (Tyrol)	Austria
Haubenschmidt, Ferdinand	Passau	Bavaria
Haupt, Eduard	Wismar	Mecklenburg-Schwerin
Haym, Rudolf	Halle, Province of Saxony	Prussia
Hayden, Eduard Ritter v. und z. Dorff	Schlierstadt (Kirchdorf)	Austria
Heckscher, Johann Gustav Wilhelm Moritz	Hamburg	
Hehner, Carl	Wiesbaden	Nassau
Heilsmann (unknown)
Heisterbergk, Franz	Rochlitz	Saxony
Henning, Eduard	Thorn (West Prussia)	Prussia
Henkel, Heinrich	Kassel	Electoral Hesse
Henßel (Hensel), Adolf Ernst	Zittau	Saxony
Hentges, Louis	Heilbronn	Württemberg
Hergenhahn, August	Wiesbaden	Nassau
Hermann, Friedrich v.	Munich	Bavaria
Hermann, Paul	Weidlitz (Bautzen) (Lusatia)	Prussia
Heubner, Otto Leonhard	Frauenstein	Saxony
Hildebrandt, Bruno	Marburg	Electoral Hesse
Hlubert (Hlubeck), Franz Xaver	Graz (Styria)	Austria
Hönninger (Hönniger), Friedrich Carl	Rudolstadt	Schwarzburg-Rudolstadt
Hoffbauer, Wilhelm	Nordhausen, Province of Saxony	Prussia
Hoffmann, Christoph	Ludwigsburg	Württemberg
Hoffmann, Julius	Eisfeld (Meiningen)	Saxe-Meiningen
Hugo, Aemil	Göttingen	Hanover

== I ==
Member name	City or district represented	State of origin
Jacobi, Carl Wilhelm	Hersfeld	Electoral Hesse
Jahn, Friedrich Ludwig	Freyburg, Province of Saxony	Prussia
Jaup, Heinrich Carl	Darmstadt	Grand Ducal Hesse
Jordan, Carl Friedrich Wilhelm	Freienwalde (Brandenburg)	Prussia
Jordan, Sylvester	Fritzlar	Electoral Hesse
Jucho, Friedrich Siegmund	Frankfurt	

== K ==
Member name	City or district represented	State of origin
Kagerbauer, Peter	Linz	Austria
Kahlert, Anton	Leobschütz (Silesia)	Prussia
Kaiser, Peter	Mauern (Vaduz)	Liechtenstein
Kaiser, Ignatz	Retz	Austria
Kalchberg, Franz Ritter Kalchegger v.	Graz (Styria)	Austria
Karajan, Theodor Georg v.	Guntersdorf	Austria
Kauzer, Georg	Lauchheim	Württemberg
Keim, Gottlieb Friedrich Ferdinand	Bayreuth	Bavaria
Kerer, Johann	Silz (Tyrol)	Austria
Kerst, Samuel Gottfried	Birnbaum (Posen)	Prussia
Ketteler, Wilhelm Emmanuel Freiherr v.	Hopsten (Lengerich) (Westphalia)	Prussia
Kierulf, Johann Friedrich Martin	Rostock	Mecklenburg-Schwerin
Knapitsch, Franz Edler v.	Klagenfurt	Austria
Knarr, Josef	Hartberg (Styria)	Austria
Knoodt, Franz Peter	Bonn (Rhineland)	Prussia
Knuth (unknown)	Bunzlau	Prussia
Koch, Carl Wilhelm Otto	Leipzig	Saxony
Kolb, Georg Friedrich	Speyer	Bavaria
Kohlparzer, Franz Xaver	Neuhaus (Neufelden)	Austria
Kompes, Gerhard	Siegburg (Rhineland)	Prussia
Kosmann, Wilhelm Albert	Stettin	Prussia
Kraft, Wilhelm Friedrich Christian Gustav	Nuremberg	Bavaria
Kramer (unknown)
Künsberg, Heinrich v.	Ansbach	Bavaria
Kürsinger, Carl v.	Damsweg (Werfen)	Austria
Kürsinger, Ignatz v.	Salzburg	Austria

== L ==
Member name	City or district represented	State of origin
Lang, Friedrich	Verden	Hanover
Lassaulx, Peter Ernst v.	Munich	Bavaria
Lavergne-Peguilhen, Alexander v.	Neidenburg (East Prussia)	Prussia
Lette, Wilhelm Adolf	Berlin	Prussia
Leue, Friedrich Gottfried	Cologne (Rhineland)	Prussia
Lieber, Eduard	Züllichau, Brandenburg	Prussia
Liebmann, Richard	Meiningen	Saxe-Meiningen
Lindenau, Bernhard v.	Pohlhof (Altenburg)	Saxe-Altenburg
Loew, Friedrich	Magdeburg, Province of Saxony	Prussia
Lowe (Loewe), Wilhelm	Calbe	Anhalt

== M ==
Member name	City or district represented	State of origin
Maier of Ottobauer (unknown)
Mally, Georg	Marburg, Styria	Austria
Maltzahn, Gustav Robert v.	Küstrin, Brandenburg	Prussia
Mammen, Franz August	Plauen	Saxony
Marcks, Eduard	Duisburg (Westphalia)	Prussia
Mareck, Titus	Graz, Styria	Austria
Martens, Heinrich Wilhelm Gottlieb	Danzig, West Prussia	Prussia
Martiny, Friedrich	Friedland (Schlochau), West Prussia	Prussia
Massow, Hermann v.	Carlsberg (Glatz), Silesia	Prussia
Mathis (Matthies), Konrad	Wolgast, Pomerania	Prussia
Mathy, Karl	Karlsruhe (Calw)	Württemberg
Matzke (Metzke), Hermann	Sagan, Silesia	Prussia
Mayer, Thomas	Memmingen	Bavaria
Mayer, Franz Ferdinand v.	Vienna	Austria
Melchers, Paulus	Münster (Westphalia)	Prussia
Megerle, Eugen Edler v. Mühlfeld	Vienna	Austria
Melly, Eduard	Horn	Austria
Merck, Ernst	Hamburg	
Mevissen, Gustav	Dulden (Hilchenbach), Rhineland	Prussia
Meyer, Georg Theodor	Lüneburg	Brunswick
Meyer, Johann Carl Christian	Liegnitz, Silesia	Prussia
Michelsen, Andreas Ludwig Jacob	Jena	Saxe-Weimar-Eisenach
Mittermaier, Carl Joseph Anton	Heidelberg	Baden
Möllingen (Mölling), Georg Friedrich	Jever	Oldenburg
Möring, Karl	Vienna	Austria
Mohl, Robert v.	Heidelberg	Baden
Mohl, Moritz	Stuttgart	Württemberg
Muck, Johann v.	Schwadorf	Austria
Müller, Johann Georg	Münster (Westphalia)	Prussia
Münch, Johannes	Wetzlar (Westphalia)	Prussia
Murschel, Wilhelm Heinrich	Stuttgart	Württemberg
Mylius, Eberhard v.	Kleve (Rhineland)	Prussia

== N ==
Member name	City or district represented	State of origin
Nagel zu Aichberg, Anton v.	Oberwiechdach (Neunburg) (Palatinate)	Bavaria
Nägele, Ferdinand	Murhardt (Backnang)	Württemberg
Nauwerk, Carl	Berlin	Prussia
Nerreter, Ernst Louis Otto	Fraustadt (Posen)	Prussia
Nicol, Carl	Hanover (Hameln)	Hanover

== O ==
Member name	City or district represented	State of origin
Obermüller, Matthias	Passau	Bavaria
Ostendorf, Julius	Soest	Prussia
Ostermünchner, Carl	Griesbach (Pfarrkirchen)	Bavaria

== P ==
Member name	City or district represented	State of origin
Pagenstecher, Heinrich Carl Alexander	Elberfeld	Prussia
Panner (Pammer), Sebastian	Schalgen (Schalchen)	Austria
Pattai, Guido	Gleinstätten	Austria
Paur, Theodor	Grottkau (Silesia)	Prussia
Paur, Adolf Xaver	Augsburg	Bavaria
Peitler, Franz	Taxenbach (Zell am See)	Austria
Pfahler, Georg	Tettnang	Württemberg
Pfeiffer, August Emanuel	Adamsdorf (Soldin)	Prussia
Pfitzer, Paul	Stuttgart	Württemberg
Philipps, Georg	Munich	Bavaria
Piexinger, P. Beda (unknown)	Efferdingen (unknown, likely Eferding, Upper Austria)	Austria
Pinchert, Friedrich	Zeitz	Prussia
Plaß, Christian Heinrich	Stade	Hanover
Plathner, Otto	Halberstadt	Prussia
Pözel, Josef	Munich	Bavaria
Pogge, Johann of Roggow (Pomerania)	Prussia	

== Q ==
Member name	City or district represented	State of origin
Quante, Andreas Bernhard	Würzburg	Bavaria

== R ==
Member name	City or district represented	State of origin
Ranzony (Ranzoni), Johann	Melk	Austria
Rappard, Conrad v.	Angermünde, Brandenburg	Prussia
Raumer, Hans v.	Dinkelsbühl	Bavaria
Raveaux, Franz	Cologne (Rhineland)	Prussia
Reden, Friedrich Wilhelm v.	Berlin, Brandenburg	Prussia
Reichard, Josef Martin	Speyer (Palatinate)	Bavaria
Reichensperger, August	Trier (Rhineland)	Prussia
Reisinger, Josef	Freistadt, Bohemia	Austria
Reindl, Franz	Ort	Austria
Reinwald (Rheinwald), Carl Friedrich v.	Bern (Spaichingen)	Württemberg
Reinhard, Ludwig	Boizenburg	Mecklenburg-Schwerin
Reinstein, August	Naumburg, Province of Saxony	Prussia
Reitmayr, August	Regensburg (Weiden)	Bavaria
Rettig (unknown)	Potsdam, Brandenburg	Prussia
Riehl, Anton	Zwettl	Austria
Riesser, Gabriel	Hamburg (Lauenburg)	Schleswig-Holstein
Roben (Röben), Johann Gerhardt	Dornum (Esens)	Hanover
Rödinger, Friedrich	Stuttgart (Öhringen)	Württemberg
Römer, Friedrich	Stuttgart (Göppingen)	Württemberg
Römer, Friedrich v.	Göppingen	Württemberg
Rönne, Friedrich v.	Berlin (Mühlhausen) (Province of Saxony)	Prussia
Roß, Edgar Daniel	Hamburg	
Ruhwandl, Max Josef	Munich (Moosburg)	Bavaria
Rüder, Maximilian Heinrich	Birkenfeld (Rhineland)	Oldenburg
Rühl, August	Hanau	Electoral Hesse
Rümelin, Gustav	Mürdingen	Württemberg

== S ==
Member name	City or district represented	State of origin
Sänger, Carl v.	Grabow (Wirsitz) (Posen)	Prussia
Schaffrath, Wilhelm	Neustadt (Stolpen)	Saxony
Schauß, Anton v.	Munich (Traunstein)	Bavaria
Scheller, Friedrich Ernst	Frankfurt a. d. Oder (Brandenburg)	Prussia
Schenk, Carl	Dillenburg (Rennerod)	Nassau
Schepp, Friedrich Wilhelm	Wiesbaden	Nassau
Scheuchenstuel, Carl v.	Leoben (Styria)	Austria
Schiedermayer, Wilhelm	Vöcklabruck	Austria
Schierenberg, Heinrich	Detmold (Lage)	Lippe-Detmold
Schilling, Ernst	Vienna	Austria
Schleussing, Franz v.	Lötzen (East Prussia)	Prussia
Schlotheim, Jérôme v.	Frankfurt a. d. Oder (Wollstein) (Posen)	Prussia
Schlüter, Arnold	Paderborn (Westphalia)	Prussia
Schmerling, Anton v.	Vienna	Austria
Schmidt, Aloys	Brixen (Tyrol)	Austria
Schmidt, Ernst (Franz)	Salzbrunn (Löwenberg) (Silesia)	Prussia
Schmidt, Joseph	Linz	Austria
Schmidt, Julius Theodor	Wurzen (Grimma)	Saxony
Schmitt, Nicolaus	Kaiserslautern (Palatinate)	Bavaria
Schneider, Johann Friedrich	Lichtenfels (Kulmbach)	Bavaria
Schoder, Adolph Gottlieb Ferdinand	Stuttgart (Besigheim)	Württemberg
Scholten, Heinrich Cornelius	Ward (Kleve) (Rhineland)	Prussia
Scholz, Franz	Neisse (Silesia)	Prussia
Schott, Albert	Stuttgart (Böblingen)	Württemberg
Schreiber, Carl Ludwig	Bielefeld (Westphalia)	Prussia
Schreiner, Gustav	Graz (Weiz) (Styria)	Austria
Schrenk v. Notzing, Karl	Munich (Cham)	Bavaria
Schubert, Friedrich Wilhelm	Ortelsburg (East Prussia)	Prussia
Schubert, Heinrich	Würzburg	Bavaria
Schüler, Christian	Jena	Saxe-Weimar
Schüler, Friedrich	Zweibrücken (Lauterecken) (Palatinate)	Bavaria
Schüler, Johannes	Innsbruck (Tyrol)	Austria
Schultze, Wilhelm	Potsdam (Ruppin) (Brandenburg)	Prussia
Schultze, Heinrich	Lübbau (Landeshut) (Silesia)	Prussia
Schulz-Bodmer, Friedrich Wilhelm	Darmstadt	Hesse-Darmstadt
Schulz, Friedrich Gottlieb	Weilburg	Duchy of Nassau
Schuselka, Franz	Klosterneuburg	Austria
Schwarz, Carl Heinrich Wilhelm	Halle (Torgau) (Province of Saxony)	Prussia
Schwarzenberg, Ludwig	Kassel	Electoral Hesse
Schwarzenberg, Philipp	Melsungen	Electoral Hesse
Schwetschke, Carl Gustav	Halle (Sangerhausen) (Province of Saxony)	Prussia
Selchow, Werner v.	Lauenburg	Schleswig-Holstein
Sellmer, Carl	Landsberg a.d. Warthe (Brandenburg)	Prussia
Senf, Emil Alexander Wilhelm	Inowrazlaw (Posen)	Prussia
Sepp, Johann Nepomuk	Doelz (Rosenheim)	Bavaria
Simon, August Heinrich	Magdeburg (Province of Saxony)	Prussia
Simon, Ludwig Gerhard Gustav	Trier (Rhineland)	Prussia
Simson, Eduard	Königsberg (East Prussia)	Prussia
Soiron, Alexander v.	Mannheim	Baden
Sonnenkalb, Carl Victor	Römschütz	Saxony-Altenburg
Spatz, Carl Alexander	Frankenthal (Palatinate)	Bavaria
Sprengel, Albert	Waren	Mecklenburg-Schwerin
Sprißler, Josef	Empfingen, Hohenzollern-Sigmaringen	Prussia
Stahl, Friedrich Wilhelm	Erlangen	Bavaria
Stedmann, Carl	Besselich (Kreuznach	Grand Ducal Hesse
Stenzel, Gustav Adolf Harald	Breslau (Silesia)	Prussia
Stieger, Johann	Klagenfurt (Carinthia)	Austria
Stolle, Friedrich	Holzminden	Brunswick-Lüneburg
Stremayr, Karl v.	Kindberg (Graz) (Styria)	Austria
Sturm, Bruno Adolf	Sorau (Lusatia)	Prussia

== T ==
Member name	City or district represented	State of origin
Tafel, Gottlob	Stuttgart (Welzheim)	Württemberg
Tafel, Franz	Zweibrücken (Palatinate)	Bavaria
Tappehorn, Franz	Oldenburg	Oldenburg
Teichert, Gottlob	Berlin	Prussia
Thinnes, Friedrich	Eichstätt	Bavaria
Treskow, Julius v.	Grocholin (Schubin) (Posen)	Prussia
Trütschler (Trützschler), Wilhelm Adolph v.	Dresden (Oelsnitz)	Saxony

== U ==
Member name	City or district represented	State of origin
Ungerbüler, Otto	Preußisch Holland (East Prussia)	Prussia
Uhland, Ludwig	Tübingen (Rottenburg)	Württemberg
Umbscheiden, Phillip	Dahn (Palatinate)	Bavaria
Unwerth, Albert August v.	Glogau (Silesia)	Prussia

== V ==
Member name	City or district represented	State of origin
Versen, Carl	Nieheim (Westphalia)	Prussia
Veit, Moritz	Berlin	Prussia
Venedey, Jacob	Cologne (Rhineland)	Prussia
Vischer, Friedrich Theodor	Tübingen	Württemberg
Vömer (unknown)
Vogel, Ernst	Eisleben (Guben) (Brandenburg)	Prussia
Vonbun, Anton	Feldberg (Feldkirch) (Vorarlberg)	Austria

== W ==
Member name	City or district represented	State of origin
Wagner, Camillo	Steyr	Austria
Waitz, Georg	Göttingen	Hanover
Waldmann, Heinrich	Heiligenstadt (Province of Saxony)	Prussia
Walter, Robert	Neustadt (Silesia)	Prussia
Wartensleben-Schwirsen, Alexander v.	Greiffenberg (Pomerania)	Prussia
Weeber (Weber), Josef	Neuburg (Donauwörth)	Bavaria
Wedekind, Eduard	Bruchhausen	Hanover
Wedemeyer, Ludwig Georg v.	Schönrade (Friedeberg in der Neumark) (Brandenburg)	Prussia
Weiß, Josef	Salzburg (Grein)	Austria
Weissenborn, Wilhelm	Eisenach	Saxe-Weimar
Welcker, Carl Theodor	Frankfurt	
Wernher, Phillip Wilhelm	Nierstein (Alsfeld) (Rhineland)	Prussia
Werthmüller, Valentin Josef	Fulda	Electoral Hesse
Wesendonck, Hugo	Düsseldorf (Westphalia)	Prussia
Wichmann, Wilhelm	Stendal (Province Saxony)	Prussia
Wiebker, August	Ueckermünde (Pomerania)	Prussia
Wiedenmann (Widenmann), Christian	Düsseldorf (Westphalia)	Prussia
Wiederhold, Ludwig Heinrich	Lübeck	
Wiest, Wilhelm	Tübingen (Bad Saulgau)	Württemberg
Wiesner, Adolf	Feldsberg	Austria
Wigard, Franz Jacob	Dresden	Saxony
Wippermann, Karl Wilhelm	Kassel	Electoral Hesse
Würth, Josef Edler v.	Wiener Neustadt	Austria
Wulffen, Friedrich v.	Passau	Bavaria
Wurm, Christian Friedrich	Hamburg	
Wydenbrugk, Oskar v.	Weimar	Saxe-Weimar

== Z ==
Member name	City or district represented	State of origin
Zachariä, Friedrich Wilhelm Conrad	Bernburg	Anhalt-Bernburg
Zachariä, Heinrich Albert	Göttingen	Hanover
Zell, Friedrich Josef	Trier (Bernkastel-Kues) (Rhineland)	Prussia
Zenetti, Johann Baptiste v.	Landshut	Bavaria
Zerzog, Adolf v.	Regensburg	Bavaria
Ziegert, August	Preuß. Minden (Westphalia)	Prussia
Zimmermann, Wilhelm	Stuttgart (Schwäbisch Hall)	Württemberg
Zimmermann, Eduard	Spandau (Brandenburg)	Prussia
Zitz, Franz Heinrich	Mainz (Rhineland)	Prussia
Zöllner, Wilhelm August	Chemnitz	Saxony
zum Sande, Johannes	Lingen (Rhineland)	Prussia

== Bibliography ==
- Stenographischer Bericht über die Verhandlungen der deutschen constituirenden NationalVersammlung zu Frankfurt a. M.; I. Abonnement, Nr. 1, Sonnabend, 2. Mai 1848. NOTE: The list in this document contains various errors which have been reproduced in the table above. Corrections to surnames or placenames are listed in parentheses next to the 2 May 1848 information.

=== Sources ===
- Sources in the German Federal Archives
- Sources (in German) by the German Federal Central Office for Political Education
- Text of the Paulskirche Constitution on Documentarchiv.de
- Collection of pamphlets from 1848 by Frankfurt University – includes official documents and books
- Gutenberg-DE: Article by Karl Marx in the Neue Rheinische Zeitung 2008/50

=== Others ===
- Paper in the German Federal Archive
- Abstract of a themed volume by the Bundeszentrale für politische Bildung
- Informationpage by the Bundestag
