= Heppenheim conference =

1847 meeting of German liberals

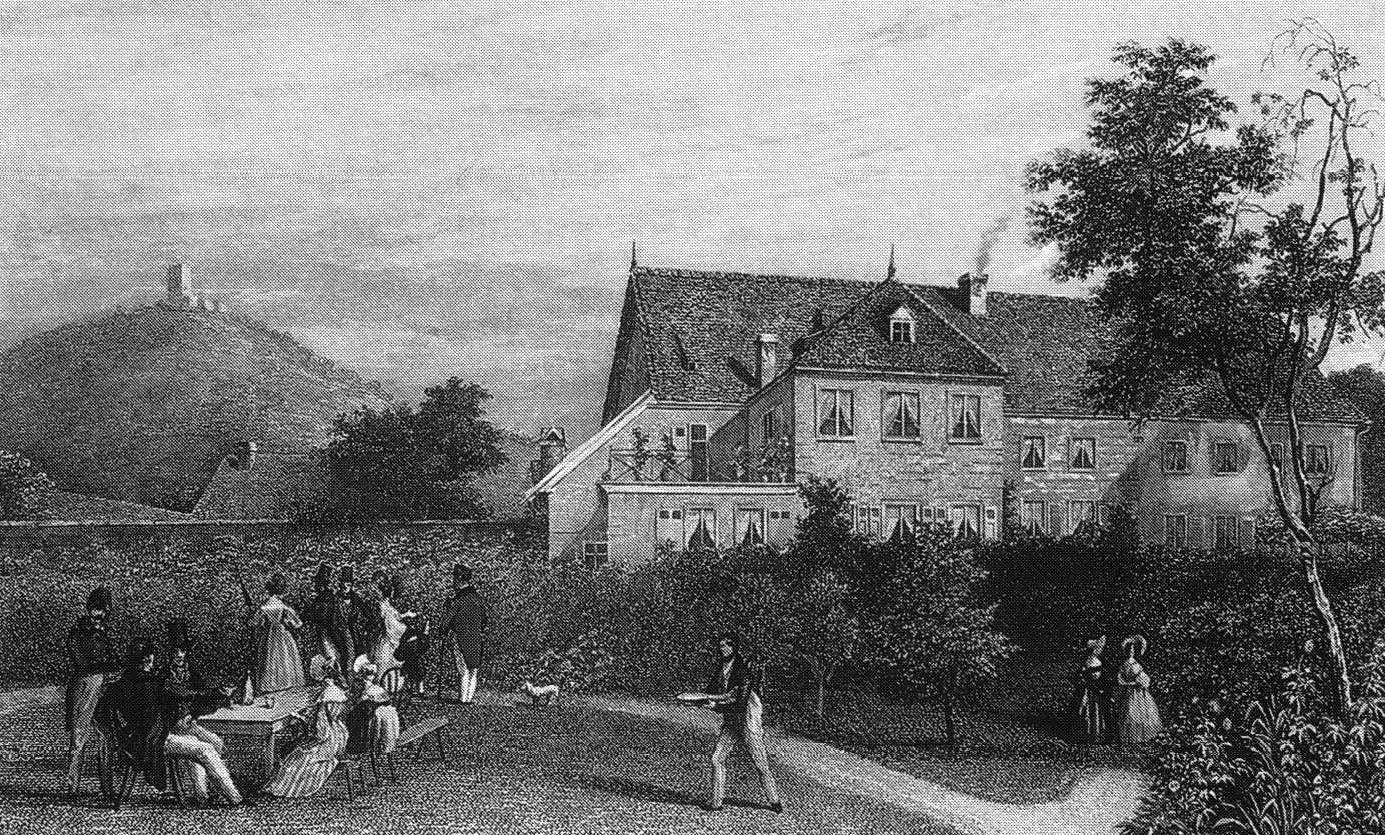
The conference venue, the inn "Zum halben Monde", in a steel engraving from 1840

The Heppenheim Conference or Heppenheim Assembly was a meeting of 18 leading southern and western German liberal politicians on October 10, 1847, at the inn Zum halben Monde in Heppenheim, Bergstraße. A key outcome of the discussions at the Heppenheim conference was the demand for the creation of a German nation-state and the granting of civil rights. These demands can be seen as the program of the moderate bourgeois-liberal forces in the run-up to the March Revolution. At the same time, the meeting paved the way for the Frankfurt National Assembly.

== Political environment ==
The civil rights introduced in some German states after the French Revolution by the Napoleonic Code Civil, as well as the constitutions subsequently granted in some states of the German Confederation after the Congress of Vienna in 1815, mostly based on Article 13 of the Federal Act and often linked to old traditions of professional law, were curtailed in the years between 1819 and 1830 by the Carlsbad Decrees and other restorative measures. For a short time, the unrest in France and Belgium in 1830 reversed this trend, as states such as Saxony and the Electorate of Hesse were granted constitutions, and freedom of the press was no longer restricted in Baden. However, after the demonstration for civil rights and national unity at the Hambach Festival in 1832 and the unsuccessful attempt at an armed uprising at the Frankfurt Wachensturm in 1833, the pressure on representatives of constitutional and democratic ideas was increased again through censorship and bans on meetings.

The parliamentary-democratic opposition and the movement for a German nation-state were then essentially confined to the chamber parliaments of the states in which state constitutions had been implemented. This was particularly true of the southern states, especially Baden. However, the members of the various state parliaments had comparatively little contact with each other during the Vormärz, although individual politicians had personal networks throughout Germany. The Hallgarten circle around Adam von Itzstein stands out here in particular. But other well-known politicians such as Robert Blum, David Hansemann, and Friedrich Daniel Bassermann also had extensive contacts in many states of the German Confederation.

In the mid-1840s, the escalation of the First Schleswig War and the construction of the Rastatt and Ulm fortresses, as well as the growing social and economic tensions that led to the hunger riots of 1847 in several states, led to more intensive attempts to network and unify the cooperation of oppositional liberal and nationalist forces, such as the founding of the Deutsche Zeitung in 1847.

== Conference ==
=== Organization and planning ===
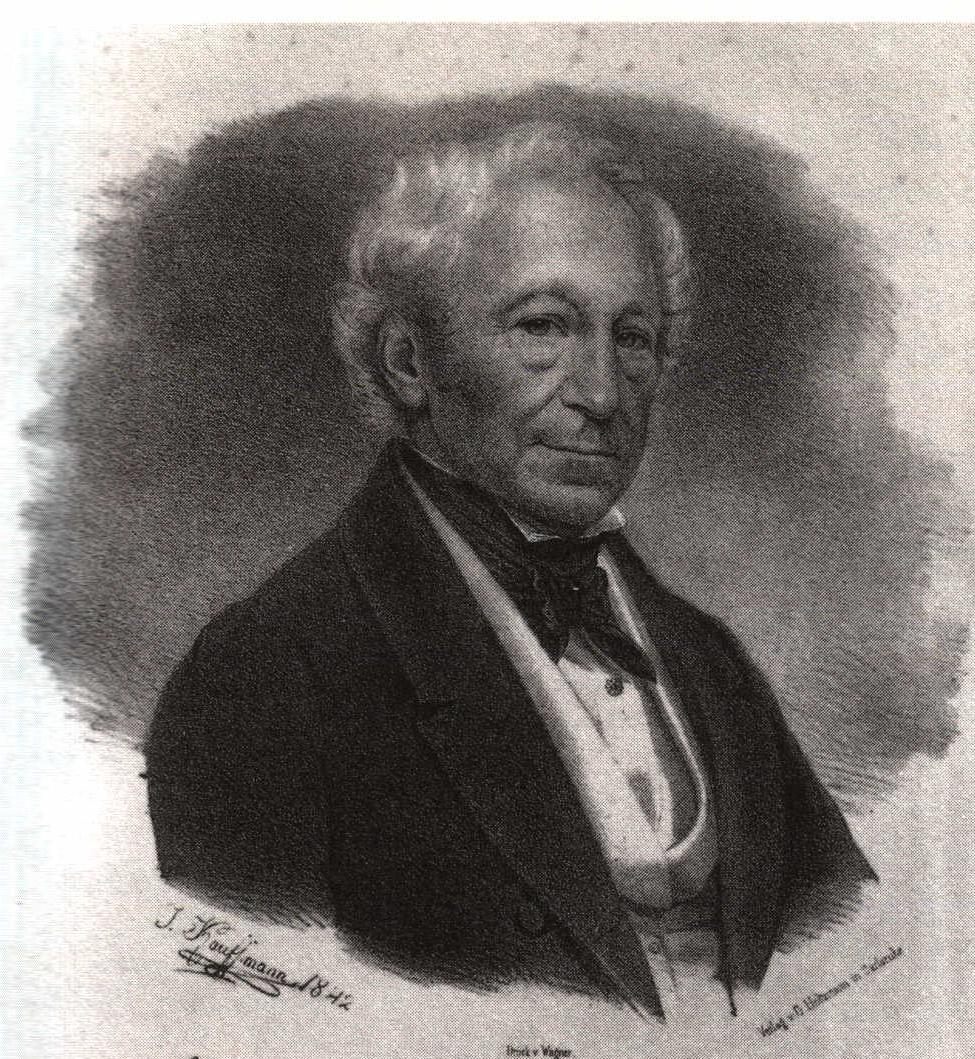
Adam von Itzstein

According to a written account given by Itzstein to Blum in 1847, Itzstein met Hansemann by chance in the apartment of the co-editor of the Deutsche Zeitung, Karl Mathy. Hansemann advocated the idea that the opposition members of the Baden, Württemberg, Hesse, and Rheinpreussens state parliaments should hold a joint meeting to coordinate their actions in their respective chamber parliaments to help the idea of German unity and civil rights, gain greater influence. According to a letter written by Bassermann to Heinrich von Gagern, the organizers went so far as "we may hope to form the beginning of a German Parliament in Heppenheim.

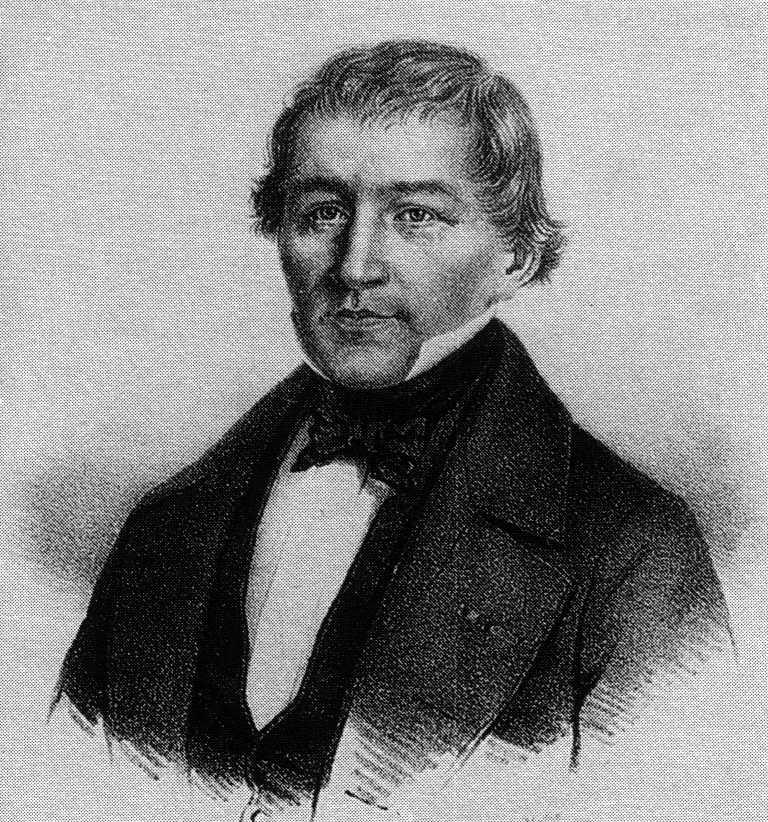
David Hansemann

Hansemann then searched for a suitable venue and finally settled on Heppenheim in Hesse. Rural Heppenheim had the advantage of being far from the centers of potential revolutionaries such as Mannheim. At the same time, the newly opened railroad line from Frankfurt am Main to Heidelberg made it easily accessible from the north via Frankfurt am Main and from the south via Mannheim, and it also had a nationally known inn, Halben Mond, near the station.

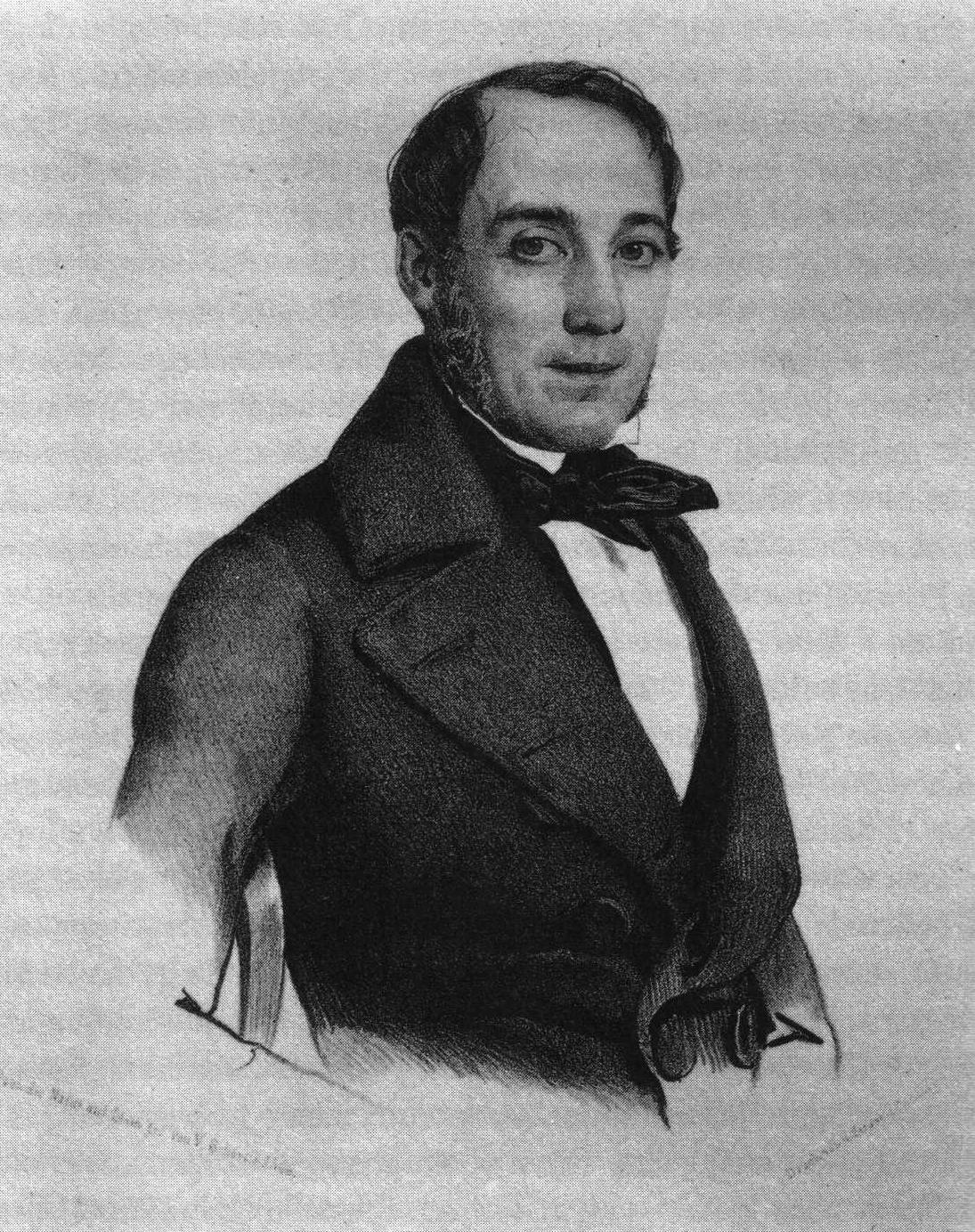
Karl Mathy

The invitations to the desired participants were sent out by letters from Hansemann, Bassermann, and Mathys to selected members of parliament on September 20, 1847, who were asked to invite other trustworthy members of parliament. While Hansemann invited primarily members of the Rhineland and electoral Hesse, including Hermann von Beckerath, Ludolf Camphausen, August von der Heydt, Gustav Mevissen, Georg von Vincke, and Karl Wilhelm Wippermann. Mathy and Bassermann wrote primarily to southern German parliamentarians, including Theodor Reh and Heinrich von Gagern, who was always advertised in these letters because of his prominence as a participant, but also to more radical democratic politicians such as Franz Peter Buhl and Christian Kapp. Although the initiators' letters repeatedly mention invitations to members of parliament in Saxony, these letters do not appear to have been sent.

=== Participants ===
Those invited worked to coordinate their travel arrangements. Mevissen had the misfortune to get the date wrong and arrived one day after the event. The initiators received refusals from several invitees, including all of the Kurhessian, Bavarian, and almost all of the Prussian delegates who had been contacted. Some of those who refused, such as Theodor Reh and August Emmerling, also cited the fear of state reprisals and the unwillingness of their constituencies to support them, if their participation in a meeting that could be considered radical, became known.

In the end, only 18 members of the Chamber attended the meeting, most of whom were members of the Second Chamber in Baden or the Second Chamber in Württemberg. Most of the participants were well-known liberals beyond their state, and most of them were later represented in the Pre-Parliament and the Frankfurt National Assembly.

==== Participants from Baden ====
Nine of the 18 participants in the Heppenheim conference were members of the Baden Second Chamber:

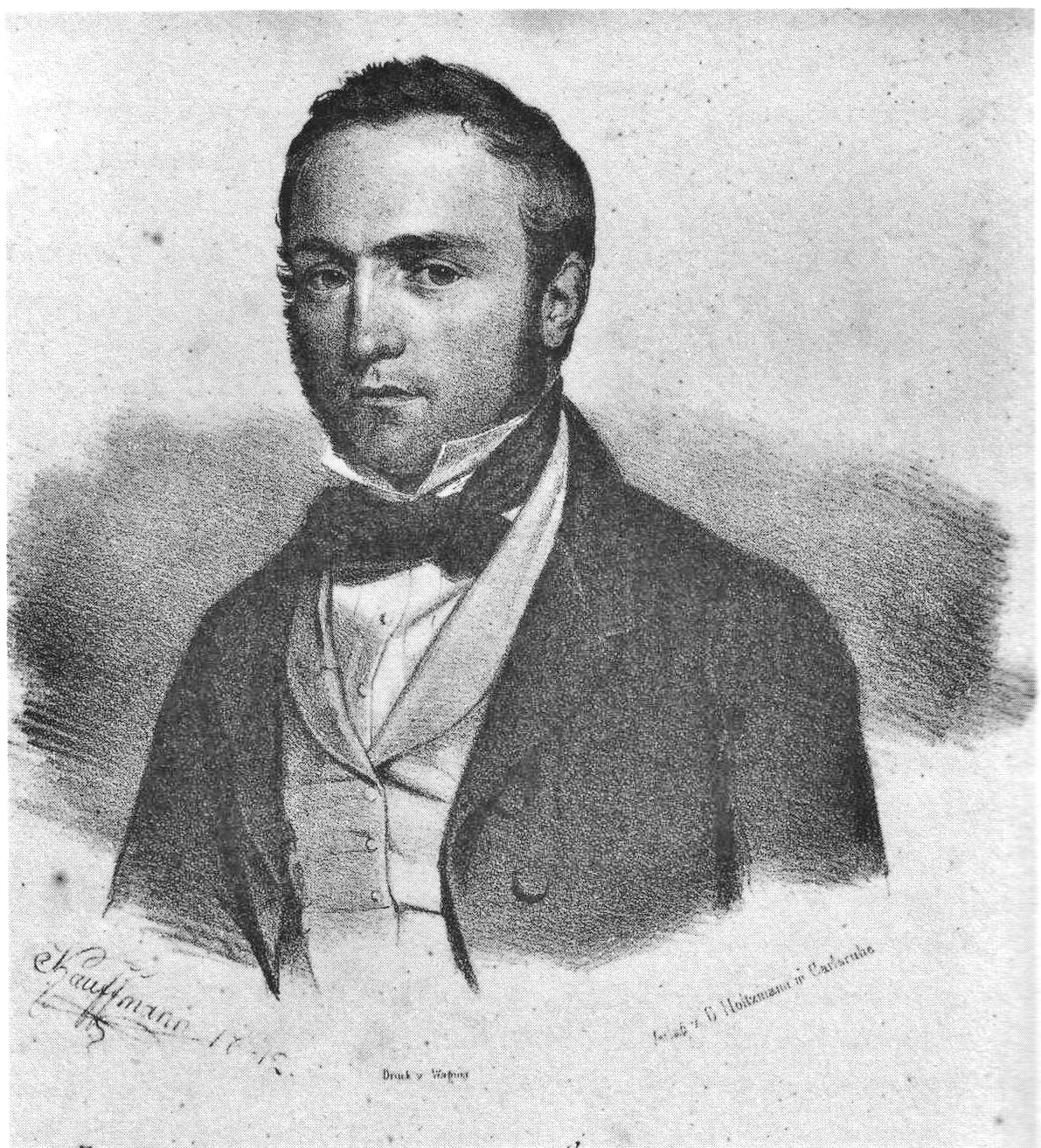
Friedrich Daniel Bassermann

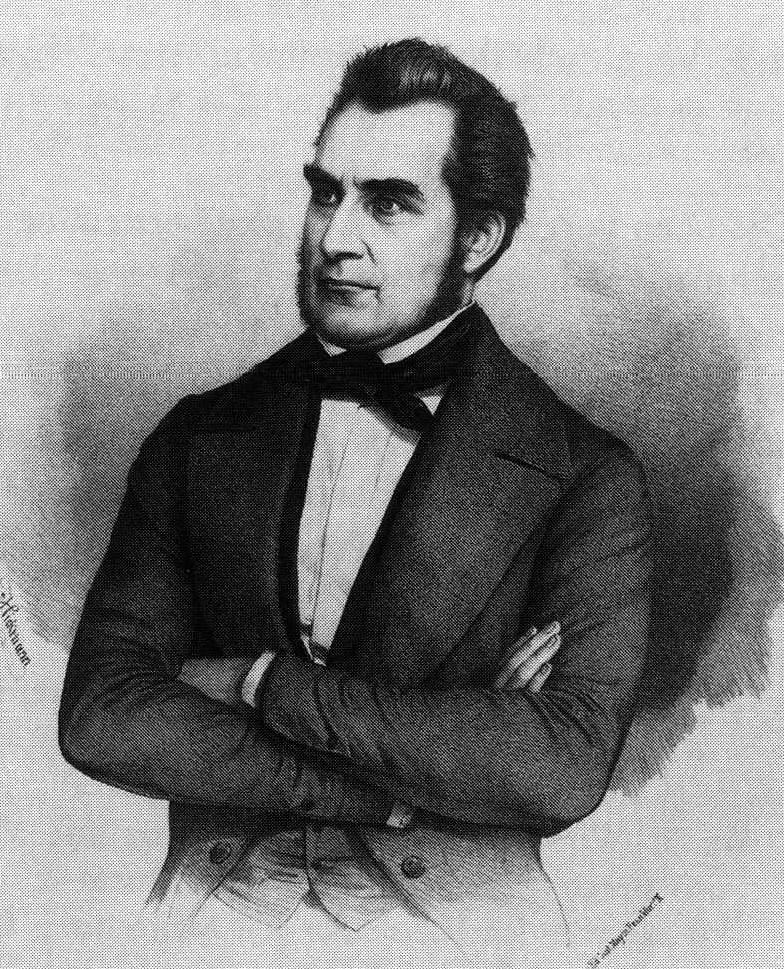
Heinrich von Gagern

- Friedrich Daniel Bassermann (1811–1855) was a merchant from Mannheim. From 1841 he was one of the most prominent opposition politicians in the Second Chamber of Baden. He was co-founder and editor of the Deutsche Zeitung. In 1848, he became chairman of the constitutional committee in the Frankfurt National Assembly.
- Franz Peter Buhl (1809–1862), a winegrower from Deidesheim, was a representative for Waldshut-Tiengen in the Second Chamber of Baden from 1844.
- August Dennig (1805–1883), a businessman from Pforzheim, had been a member of the Baden Second Chamber since 1845.
- Adam von Itzstein (1775–1855) had been a member of the Second Chamber since 1822 and resigned from the Baden civil service in 1823 for political reasons. His estate in Hallgarten served as a meeting place for the liberal opposition.
- Christian Kapp (1798–1874) was a professor at the University of Heidelberg and a member of the Baden Court Council until 1844 when he resigned for political reasons. He represented Offenburg in the Second Chamber in 1846. In 1848 he became a member of the Frankfurt National Assembly.

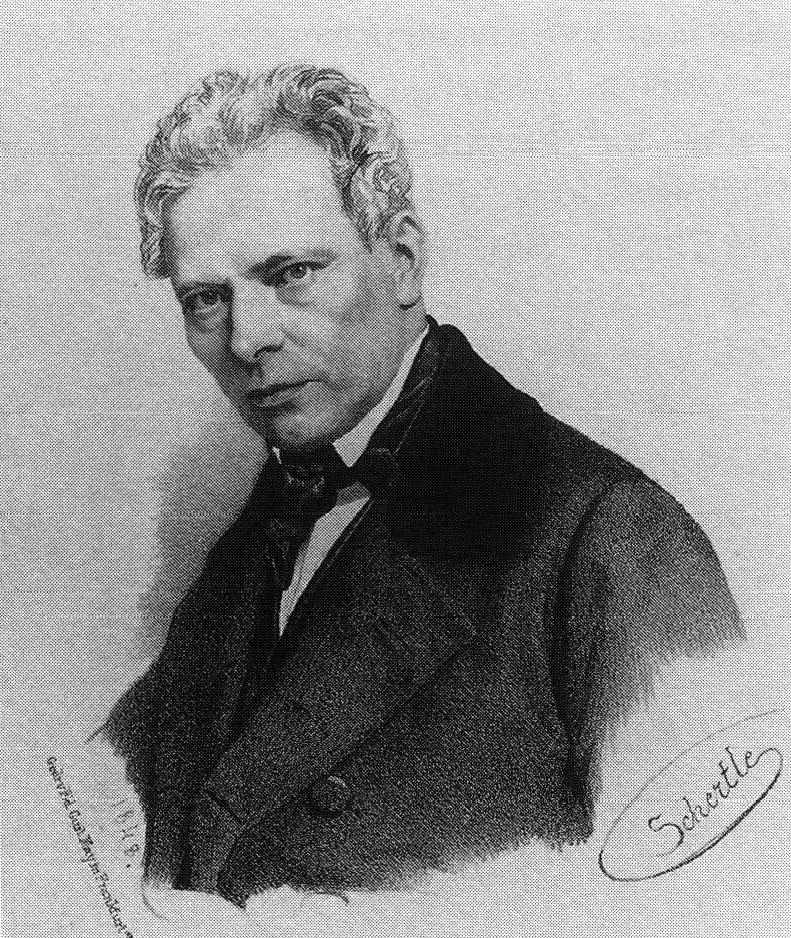
Carl Theodor Welcker

- Karl Mathy (1807–1868) worked as a journalist in Karlsruhe and Mannheim after returning from Switzerland, where he had been forced to emigrate in 1835 for political reasons, and was co-editor of the Deutsche Zeitung. From 1842 he was a member of the Baden Second Chamber of Parliament for Konstanz. In 1866, Mathy became Baden's minister of state.
- Alexander von Soiron (1806–1855) was a lawyer in Mannheim. He was a member of parliament for Lahr in the Second Chamber from 1845. In 1848 he became a member of the Frankfurt National Assembly.
- Carl Theodor Welcker (1790–1869) was a professor at the University of Freiburg and was suspended and retired several times for political reasons. Together with Karl von Rotteck, Welcker was editor of the Staatslexikon. Since 1831 he was a member of the Second Chamber of Baden.
- Ludwig Weller (1800–1863), like Soiron, was a lawyer in Mannheim. He was a member of the Second Chamber from 1835 to 1852.

==== Participants from Hesse-Darmstadt ====
Two participants were members of the Second Chamber of the Grand Duchy of Hesse:

- Heinrich von Gagern (1799–1880) was a Hessian civil servant until his forced retirement in 1832. Gagern was one of the best-known opposition politicians in the German Confederation and was the most prominent advocate of a constitutional monarchy for Germany. In 1847, he was a parliament member for Lorsch in the Hessian Second Chamber. In 1848, he became President of the National Assembly, Prime Minister of the Reich and Prime Minister of the Grand Duchy of Hesse.
- Philipp Wilhelm Wernher (1802–1887) lived as a winegrower in Nierstein. He had been a member of the Second Chamber of Hesse-Darmstadt since 1844. In 1848, he became a member of the National Assembly.

==== Participants from Nassau ====
- August Hergenhahn (1804–1874) was the only member of parliament from Nassau's Second Chamber in Heppenheim. He was a judicial officer from Wiesbaden, which he had represented as a parliament member since 1846. In 1848, he became Prime Minister of the March Government of the Duchy.

==== Participants from Prussia ====
- David Hansemann (1790–1864) was a successful industrialist and banker from Aachen. He was a member of the Rhenish provincial parliament from 1845. In 1848, Hansemann became finance minister in the Prussian March government. In 1851, he founded the Disconto-Gesellschaft.

==== Participants from Württemberg ====
Five deputies from Württemberg's Second Chamber took part in the meeting in Heppenheim:

- Friedrich Federer (1799–1883) was co-owner of a bank in Stuttgart. From 1845 to 1849, he was a member of the Württemberg Second Chamber. In 1848 he became a member of the National Assembly and in 1849, like Gagern and Soiron, was a delegate in the Imperial Deputation.
- Karl August Fetzer (1809–1885) lived as a lawyer and judge in Stuttgart and was a member of the Second Chamber. In 1848 he became secretary of the Frankfurt National Assembly.
- Adolf Goppelt (1800–1875) ran a trading business in Heilbronn. From 1839, he was a member of parliament for Heilbronn in the Second Chamber of Württemberg. In 1848, he was appointed Minister of Finance in the Württemberg March Government.
- Friedrich Römer (1794–1864) was a lawyer in Stuttgart and the nationally known leader of the liberal opposition in Württemberg's Second Chamber. In 1848, he became Minister of Justice in the Württemberg March Government. In 1849, he summoned the disintegrating National Assembly to Stuttgart as a rump parliament and shortly afterward used military force to ensure the final dissolution of the National Assembly.
- Wilhelm Murschel (1795–1869) also worked as a lawyer in Stuttgart. He was a deputy for Rottweil in the Second Chamber and became a member of the Frankfurt National Assembly in 1848.

=== Outcome of the meeting ===
The negotiations and results of the discussions at the Heppenheim meeting were mainly made public through a report by Mathys in the Deutsche Zeitung on October 15, 1847. Other newspapers took over this information and thus ensured that the results of the Heppenheim conference were widely disseminated. The creation of this publicity was a special feature, as previous meetings had always been kept private for fear of state persecution. Bassermann saw this publication in particular as "the big difference between this meeting and the earlier ones at Hallgarten, in Saxony, etc."

According to this newspaper report was

the purpose of the meeting [...] apart from the desire to become personally acquainted with each other, the exchange of thoughts and views on the most expedient way to bring more unity and commonality into the management and representation of German national affairs and interests; then to determine the motions which in this respect, related to common rights and for the remedy of the general evils arising in the present, should be submitted to the State parliaments[...].

However, the meeting went far beyond this topic, as it already paved the way for the Heidelberg Assembly of the 51 and the Pre-Parliament through the desire for annual meetings.

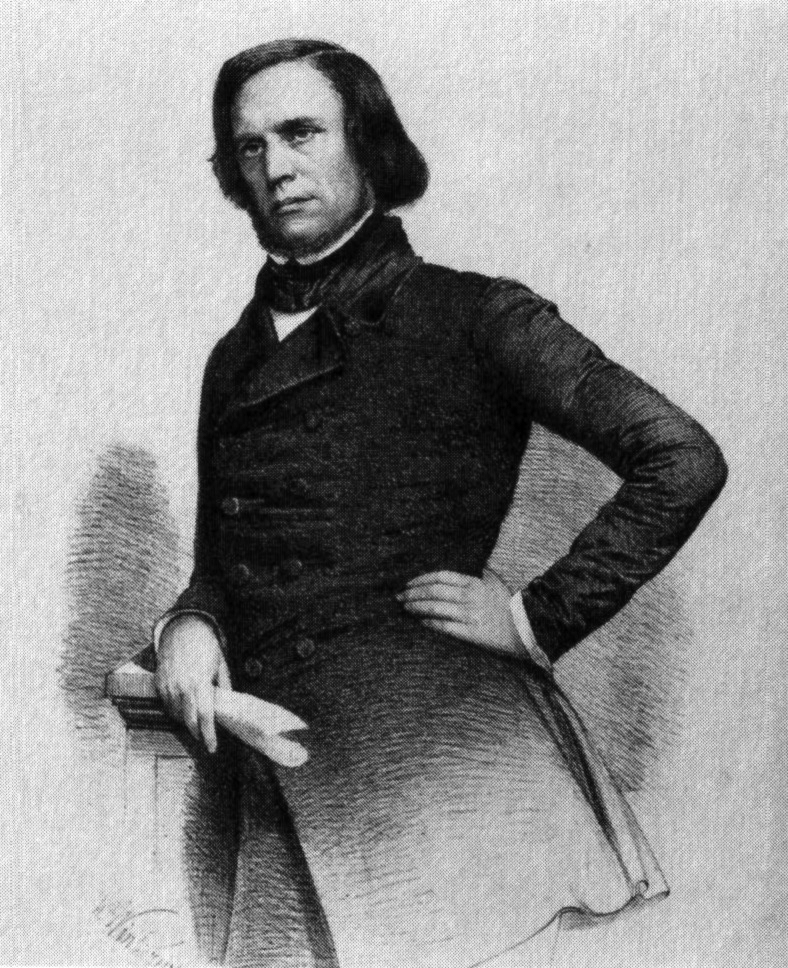
August Hergenhahn

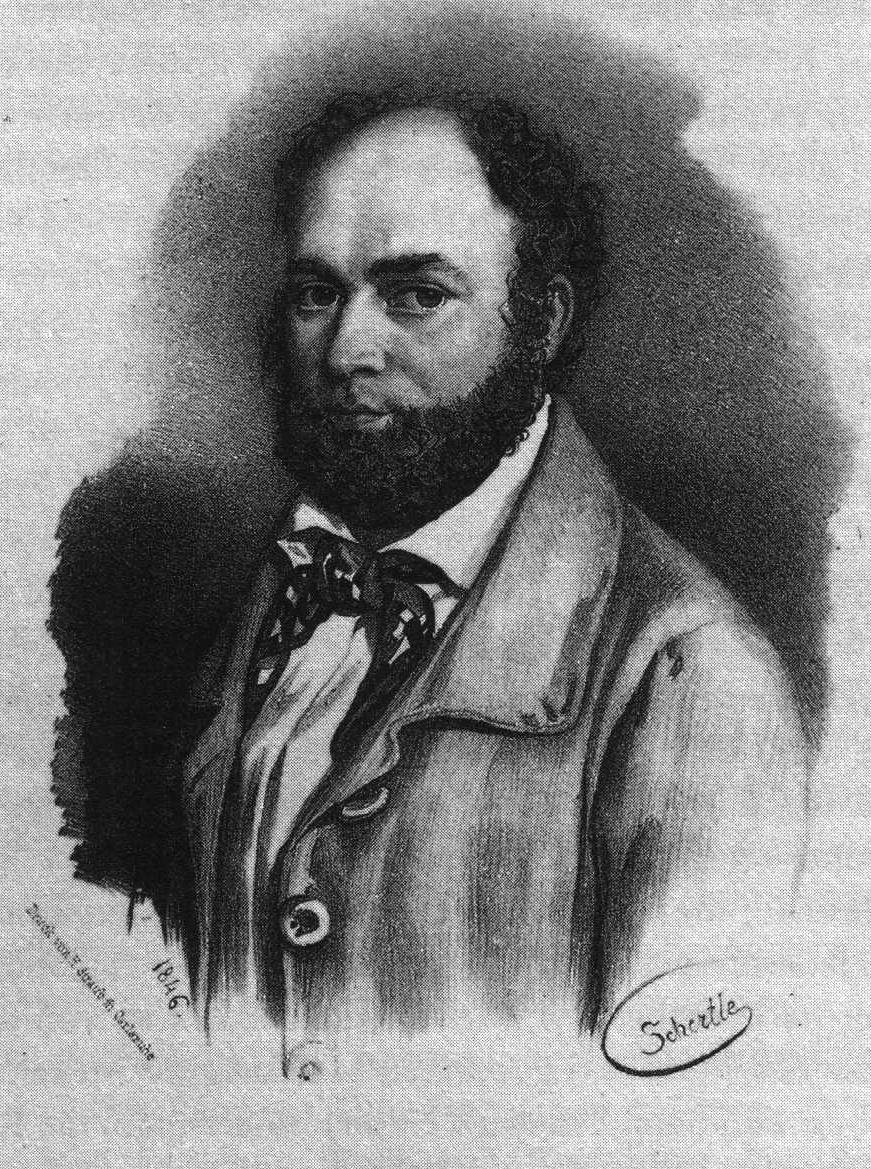
Alexander von Soiron

The negotiations and decisions of the Assembly focused primarily on creating a German national state and the representation of the people that this entailed. At the suggestion of Hansemann and Mathys, in particular, and against the initial resistance of Bassermann and Welcker, the participants wanted to achieve these "national issues" by extending the powers and creating a government for the German Customs Union, which had existed since 1834, since "nothing fruitful could be expected from the German Confederation". The latter was mainly due to the fact "that foreign powers such as Denmark and the Netherlands" were part of the Confederation and the latter could therefore never have an interest in the unification of Germany. For those present, however, the customs union was "the only bond of common German interests" and this was "not created by the Confederation, but outside it by treaties between the individual states". Thus, the formation of a unified state was to be achieved by transferring responsibility for trade, transportation, taxation, and industrial policy from the states of the German Confederation to the Customs Union. "The participation of the people through elected representatives was indispensable". At the conference, this was understood to mean, a consultative assembly of estates, on whose five-member college confidence should lead the German Customs Union.

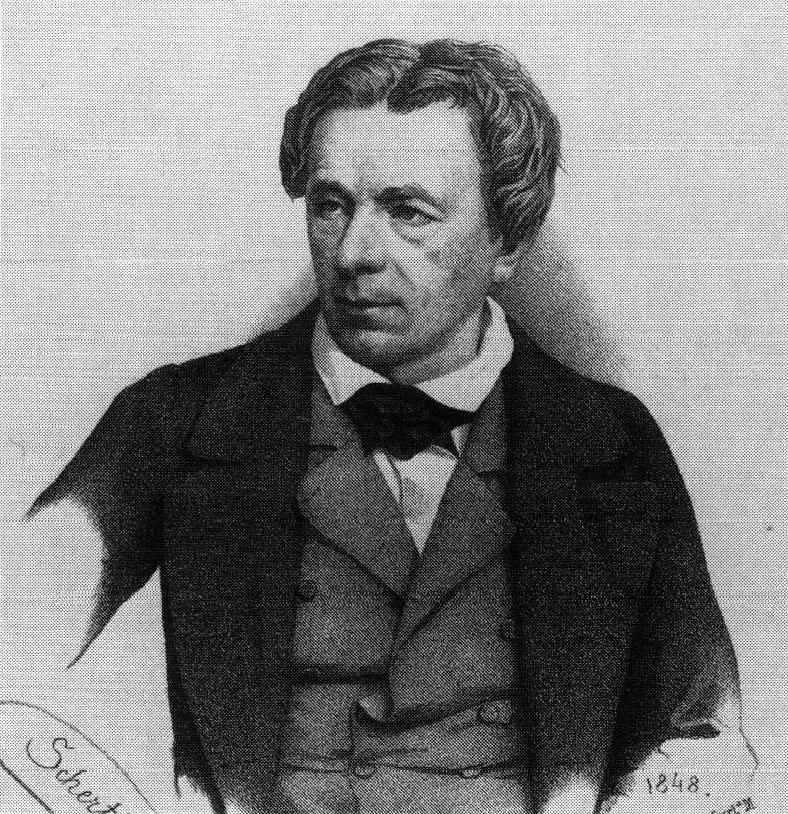
Friedrich Römer

Those present were aware that the transformation of the German Customs Union into a political instrument would not be easy, especially as the German Customs Union was ultimately envisioned as a Greater German solution. The conference participants also assumed that the states would not join the Customs Union on their own and cede further powers, but hoped that the economic advantages of the Customs Union, which would then have more powers, would create a situation of economic coercion. Hansemann emphasized that this solution should not lead to Prussian hegemony, as it was already the case in the previous Customs Union due to the individual agreements between the member states and Prussia.

The parliamentarians also demanded

"The liberation of the press, so that the Germans can share in the unfettered efficacy of this most powerful means of education, and be freed from the shame that foreign countries so often cast upon their faces because they have not yet attained one of the highest goods of free nations, long promised to themselves; public and oral trial by jury, separation of the administration from the administration of justice, transfer of all branches of the administration of justice, administrative justice and police power to the courts and drafting of appropriate police penal laws, liberation of the land and its cultivators from medieval burdens, independence of the municipalities in the administration of their affairs, reduction of the expenses for the standing army and introduction of a national army."

made it clear, however, that this should be achieved by constitutional means, i.e. not by revolution.

Regarding the pressing social problems of the lower classes, who had suffered considerable hardship (pauperism) as a result of several failed harvests and the collapse of pre-industrial structures, the list of results of the conference simply stated that a commission was to study the matter and formulate proposals in a year, that took into account the "fair distribution of public burdens to relieve the small middle class and the working people."

The results of the conference thus deviated from the traditional liberal list of demands, which usually included parliamentary representation in the German Confederation. Hansemann's argument for preferring the German Customs Union to the German Confederation was based, on one hand, on the harmonization of laws already taking place within the German Customs Union, which would result in a central legislative body, and, on the other hand, on the foreign policy pull that the German Customs Union would have as an all-German contracting party in trade policy. In addition, Hansemann expected the growing importance of the German Customs Union to strengthen the political position of the merchants compared to the nobility.

== Heppenheim Conference and Offenburg Assembly ==
The demands for dealing with the social and economic problems of small farmers and artisans, as well as the ways and means of achieving political goals, differed from the demands of the Offenburg Assembly, which had been proclaimed a month earlier in Offenburg as part of a people's assembly. From this, as well as from the fact that left-wing politicians such as Gustav Struve, Robert Blum, and Friedrich Hecker were not invited, it has often been concluded in research, especially in GDR research, that the Heppenheim conference was a response by the moderate liberals to the "democratic" Offenburg event, and that the later break between the radical-democratic and constitutional-liberal opposition was already visible here. However, this conclusion proved to be premature. On one hand, the circle of invitees was limited to members of parliament from the outset, which excluded Blum and Struve, and Hecker had already resigned his seat in the Baden Second Chamber in March 1847. On the other hand, Kapp, for example, one of the main speakers in Offenburg and therefore the subject of treason investigations, was present in Heppenheim, which speaks against the competition between the events. The Offenburg meeting also had the character of a regional people's assembly, so that the demands were necessarily simpler and more radical and were dominated by social issues and civil rights issues, whereas the Heppenheim meeting, as an assembly of delegates from several states, focused on German unification. Beyond that, the programs are still quite similar. For these reasons and from later friendly contacts between the two alleged camps, it can be concluded that the break in the opposition did not occur until 1848 and is not connected with the Heppenheim Conference.

The only point of conflict that emerged at this time was an economic one and was concerned with securing the living conditions of the small farmers and craftsmen affected by the disintegrating pre-industrial structures. Here, Hecker and Struve advocated what the liberals saw as a backward-looking industrial and commercial program that was directed against the abolition of customs duties and cross-border trade, while the liberals saw the liberalization of trade and commerce in the German Confederation precisely as a pacemaker for the creation of a nation-state and the raising of general prosperity.

== Impact of the Heppenheim conference ==
The report on the conference in the Deutsche Zeitung triggered consultations with the governments in the German Confederation as well as secret service activities against the participating members of parliament. In a letter to his London envoy Christian Karl Josias von Bunsen, Prussian King Frederick William IV denounced the conference participants as "sectarians" and "Heppenheim demagogues.

The Baden Minister Alexander von Dusch told the Württemberg envoy that the conference

"surprised him to the highest degree; he considered it to be the most important [event] that had occurred in Germany in our time; it was to be regarded as more than the beginning of a people's parliament that placed itself above the Federal Assembly and the individual governments. The assembly was comparable to the clubs that existed in Paris at the time of the Revolution, with the only difference being that the former would move from one German city to another. It was therefore the most urgent duty of the governments to take the appropriate measures in their own interests and he agreed that these should come from the Confederation."

However, due to the political events at the beginning of 1848 in the run-up to the approaching March Revolution, there was hardly any government action. The Heppenheim program points appeared together with the Offenburg demands at various points and in several popular assemblies, for example at the Stuttgart popular assembly on 17 January 1848 and the Mannheim popular assembly on 27 February 1848.

Bassermann finally submitted - in his own words "following the agreement made in Heppenheim" - a motion for a German National Assembly - albeit independent of the German Customs Union - in the Second Chamber of Baden on February 12, 1848, based on the motion Bassermann had already submitted in 1844. He attracted widespread attention in the course of the political development of the February Revolution in France and the subsequent March Revolution in the states of the German Confederation. The public movement, which took on a life of its own, led via the Heidelberg Assembly of 51 to the convening of the Pre-Parliament, which prepared the elections to the Frankfurt National Assembly and whose final document of April 4, 1848 explicitly referred to the "men who had gathered in Heppenheim and Heidelberg". On May 18, 1848, the National Assembly finally convened for the first time in the Paulskirche in Frankfurt.

== Reference to Heppenheim ==
After the Second World War, the FDP held its founding party conference in Heppenheim on December 10, 1948. At this party conference, the liberal parties of the three western occupation zones united to form a single party. With this choice of location, the founding members wanted to place themselves in the liberal legacy of the historic Heppenheim conference.

== 21st century ==
In 2011, the vacant building of the Halber Mond on the site of the conference venue in Heppenheim was converted into a conference hotel bearing the name Haus der Demokratie (House of Democracy).

== Bibliography ==
- Friedrich Daniel Bassermann: Denkwürdigkeiten 1811–1855. Published by Ernst von Bassermann-Jordan and Friedrich von Bassermann-Jordan. Frankfurt Publishing House, Frankfurt 1926.
- Lothar Gall: Bürgertum in Deutschland. Siedler, Berlin 1989, ISBN 3-88680-259-0
- Roland Hoede: Die Heppenheimer Versammlung vom 10. Oktober 1847. W. Kramer, Frankfurt am Main 1997, ISBN 3-7829-0471-0
- Karl Mathy: Versammlung von Kammermitgliedern aus verschiedenen deutschen Staaten; [...]. In: Deutsche Zeitung. Heidelberg 1847, 17 (October 15), p. 1, (Online-Version also in germanhistorydocs).
