= Imperial Constitution =

Imperial Constitution can refer to:

- Germany's Paulskirchenverfassung
- Japan's Meiji Constitution
