= Constitution of the German Reich =

The Constitution of the German Reich can refer to the following:

- The Frankfurt Constitution of 1849.
- The Constitution of the German Empire of 1871.
- The Weimar Constitution of 1919.
