= Adolf Wiesner =

Austrian writer and revolutionary

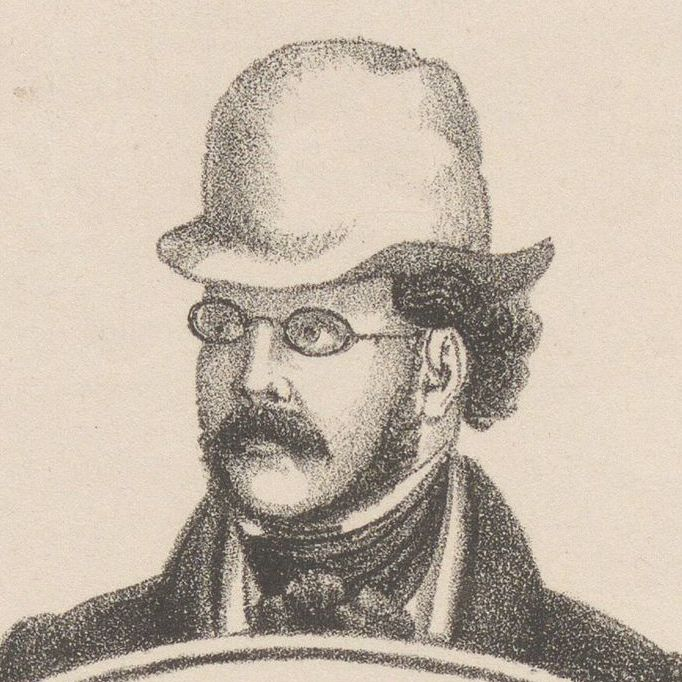
- Wiesner as depicted in an 1848 caricature

Member of the Frankfurt Parliament
- In office May 18, 1848 – May 31, 1849

Personal details
- Born: Adolph Angelus Wiener; 1807 Prague, Austrian Empire
- Died: September 23, 1867 (aged 59–60) New York City, United States
- Party: Republican
- Education: University of Vienna
- Occupation: Journalist, writer, politician

Adolf Wiesner (1807 – September 23, 1867) was an Austrian journalist, playwright, author, and revolutionary who fled to the United States after the Revolutions of 1848.

== Biography ==
Wiesner was born Adolf Wiener to a Jewish family in Prague in 1807, though later changed his surname to Wiesner after converting to Roman Catholicism due to his desire to pursue a legal career. After practicing law in Vienna for a few years, Wiesner began his writing career, which included several successful plays, with the aid of Franz Anton von Kolowrat-Liebsteinsky, the Interior Minister of the Austrian Empire.

In 1846, Wiesner left Vienna for Frankfurt due to the political situation in the former. He was elected to the short-lived revolutionary Frankfurt Parliament in 1848 and sat with the extreme Left. During his brief tenure as a parliamentarian, he was the editor of the Frankfurter Oberpostamts-Zeitung.

Following the dissolution of the Frankfurt Parliament and the end of the revolutions, Wiesner chose to immigrate to the United States alongside many other revolutionaries. He first settled in New York, where he worked for steamship and railroad companies before returning to journalism as the editor of Geist der Weltliteratur in 1860. He then moved to Baltimore where he edited the Turn-Zeitung and became an active leader of the Republican Party there. During the American Civil War, Wiesner engaged in work to assist wounded Union soldiers, which earned him an appointment in the Baltimore Customs House. After the war ended, he went to Chicago and worked briefly for the Illinois Staats-Zeitung. When the general amnesty was declared in Germany, he decided to return home but suffered from Typhoid fever and died shortly after arriving in New York City.

== Selected bibliography ==
=== Plays ===
- Inez de Castro, 1842
- Die Geiseln und der Negersklave
- Der Fiend
- Der Arzt und Seine Tochter

=== Political works ===
- Russisch-Politische Arithmetik, 1844 (2 volumes)
- Denkwürdigkeiten der Oesterreichischen Censur vom Zeitalter der Reformation bis auf die Gegenwart, 1847
