= Georg Achleitner =

Georg Achleitner (18 February 1806 – 31 May 1883) was an Austrian lawyer and politician, most notably as a deputy to the Frankfurt Parliament in 1848–1849.

== Education and career ==
Achleitner was born on 18 February 1806 at Leissigen, Austrian Empire (now part of Frankenburg am Hausruck, Austria). He was the son of a miller. In 1825, he went to Vienna to study law. In 1831, he returned home and began a law career. From 1831 to 1834, he was legal intern at the courthouse in Strobl. From 1834 to 1835, he was an official of the so-called patrimonial court in Frankenburg and Engelszell. Until the mid-19th century, these courts handled the business of aristocratic landlords independently of the state judicial system. From 1835 to 1849, Achleitner was counsel in Ried, from 1850 to 1854 the regional court assessor in Linz, and from 1854 to 1856 district director in Frankenmarkt. In the period of 1856 to 1863, Achleitner was chief counsel and district judge in Wels, became a justice for the Crownland of Austria above the Enns (Upper Austria) in 1863, and finally in 1875 was appointed chief justice, from which he retired a year later.

== Politics ==
Achleitner was an original deputy of the Frankfurt Parliament, sitting from its opening session on 18 May 1848 until 13 April 1849. He represented the constituency of the twelfth voting district for Austria above the Enns and Salzburg (Ried). There, he joined the Westendhall faction, ideologically a left-wing establishment with pragmatic pro-monarchist tendencies. Achleitner spoke out against the proposal to elect the Prussian king Frederick William IV as German Emperor, signing the circular note of protest on 3 April 1849, the day the crown was offered to the Prussian King.

In tandem with Anton Schmerling, he encouraged the other Austrian deputies to leave the Frankfurt Parliament, all of whom did so on 5 April and formally submitted his resignation eight days later.

Achleitner served as a deputy to other Austrian parliaments: from 1848 to 1849, in the Upper Austrian provincial estates as a member of the Provisional National Committee; from 1849 to 1861 a member of the state diet of Upper Austria; and from 1864 until 1867 a member of the Upper Austrian parliament, after which he excused himself from political activities and concentrated on his judicial work.

Achleitner 31 May 1883 in Linz.

== See also ==
- List of members of the Frankfurt Parliament

== Sources ==
- Heinrich Best und Wilhelm Weege: Biographisches Handbuch der Abgeordneten der Frankfurter Nationalversammlung 1848/49. Droste, Düsseldorf 1996, ISBN 3-7700-5193-9
- Biography (in German) of Georg Achleitner on the Server of Bundesland Oberösterreich.
