= Bassermann Verlag =

German publisher

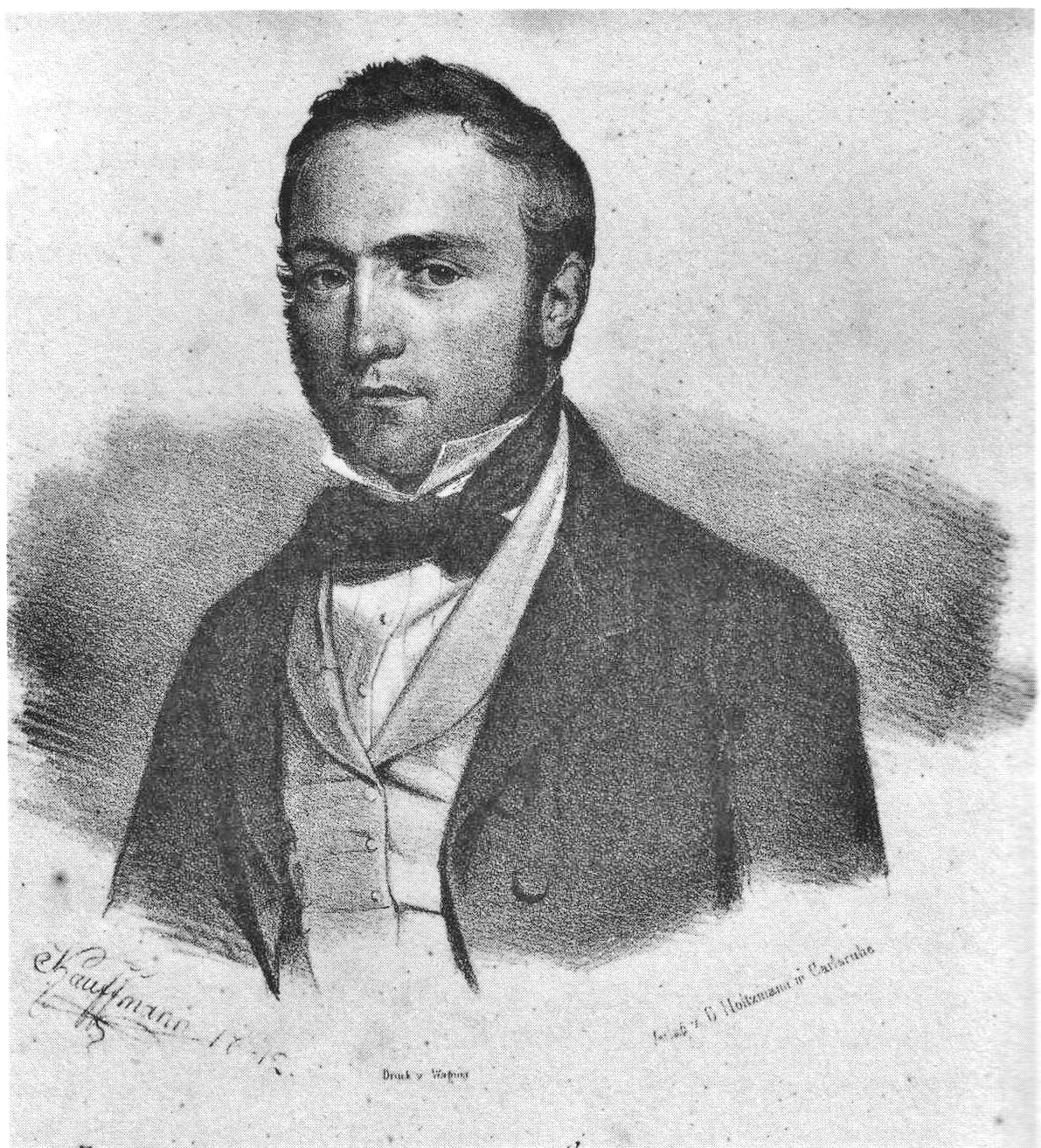
Friedrich Daniel Bassermann

The Bassermann'sche Verlagsbuchhandlung, today Bassermann Verlag, is a publisher based in Munich. The publisher is part of Random House.

== History ==
The publisher was founded in 1843 as Bassermann & Mathy by Friedrich Daniel Bassermann and Karl Mathy in Mannheim. At this time, Bassermann published nonfiction and novels by authors such as August Heinrich Hoffmann von Fallersleben. After Mathy left the publisher, it was renamed to the Bassermann'sche Verlagsbuchhandlung in 1854. Ten years after the death of the founder, his son, Otto Friedrich Bassermann, took over the management of the publisher and moved its headquarters to Heidelberg. From there it was transferred to Munich in 1878. Bassermann junior succeeded to win the author Wilhelm Busch for his publisher. Busch published between 1872 and 1904 all his books at Bassermann and became the principal author of the Bassermann.

In 1973 Frank Sicker bought the publisher and moved it from Munich to Niedernhausen. The books published were part of the assortment of the Falken-Verlag, which also belonged to Frank Sicker. The Bassermann'sche Verlagsbuchhandlung did not publish anything until 1988 when Sicker started a new publishing program under the name Bassermann Verlag.

In 1998, Random House publishing group bought the publisher and moved its headquarters in 2002 to Munich once again.

== Program ==
The Bassermann Verlag describes itself as "dedicated to inexpensive special issues on popular topics, especially in the areas of guides and nonfiction as well as high-quality illustrated books" According to their records they published about 130 new books each year.
