= Christian Kapp =

German philosopher and political activist

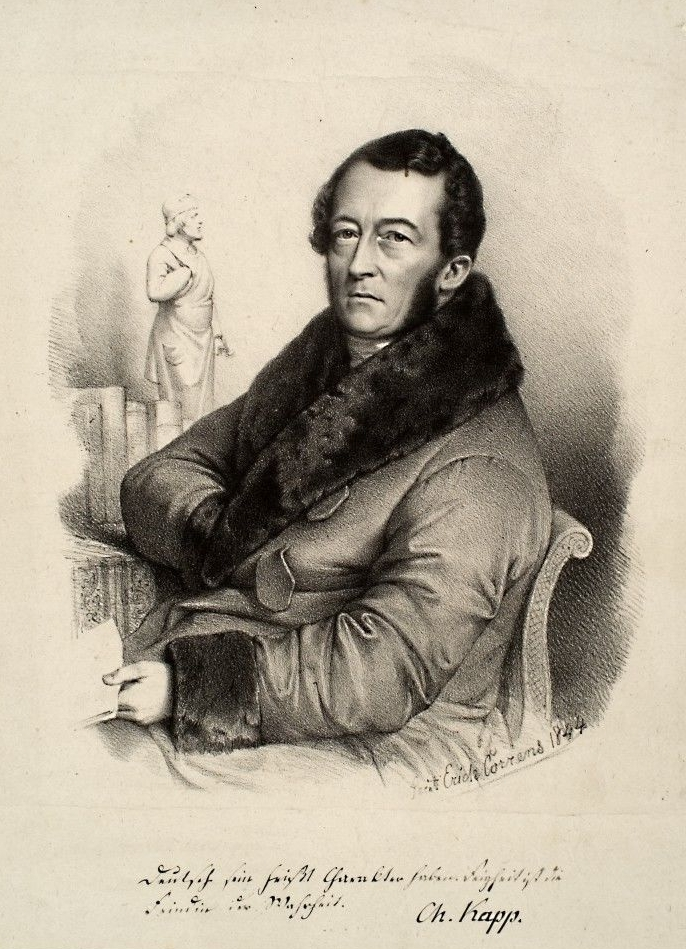
In 1844

Johann Georg Christian Kapp (March 18, 1798 – December 31, 1874) was a German philosopher and political activist. He taught Hegelian philosophy at the University of Erlangen and later at the University of Heidelberg. A friend of Ludwig Feuerbach, he was known for his political activism for the cause of the democratic left.

== Life and work ==
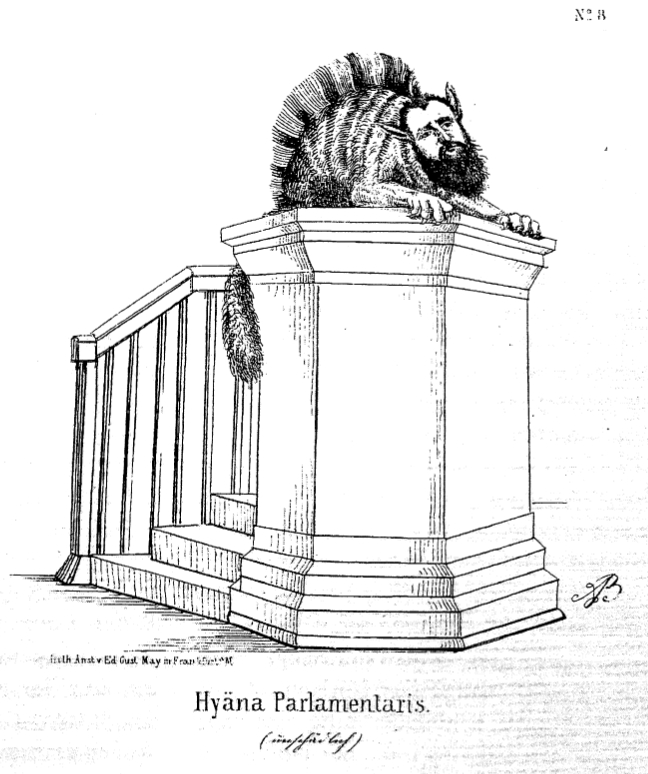
Caricature of Kapp c. 1848. He called the assembly members as corpses.

Kapp was born in Bayreuth where his family included Franconian theologians and philologists. His father Johann Kapp was a councillor married to Henriette née Müller. His relatives Johann Erhard Kapp and Christian Erhard Kapp were historians. His uncle Johannes Kapp was a high school preacher. His brother Alexander Kapp became an educator.

From 1816 to 1819 he studied theology at Berlin with Friedrich Schleiermacher, August Neander and Wilhelm Martin Leberecht de Wette, but shifted to philosophy under the influence of Hegel. His doctorate (1819) and habilitation (1823) were in Erlangen. He then taught and wrote. His early writings led to criticism from Friedrich Wilhelm Joseph Schelling who claimed that Kapp had plagiarised. In 1824 he became a professor of philosophy at Erlangen. He met Ludwig Feuerbach with whom he maintained regular correspondence. In the 1830s he moved to Heidelberg, shortly after marrying Emilie Friederike who came from a wealthy family, allowing him to work privately. The move followed his dismissal from Bavarian service in 1839 and he accepted an honorary professor position at the University of Heidelberg. In 1840 he became a full professor and his lectures were popular. In 1842 he campaigned for the habilitation of Moritz Carriere who was Hegel's student and had been rejected by the University of Berlin. The Heidelberg theology professors Ullmann and Umbreit also rejected Carriere.

Feeling that the University did not have enough freedom he started having discussions at his home and gave lectures at the Heidelberg town hall. The meetings became a regular place for Ludwig Feuerbach, Karl Theodor Welcker, Berthold Auerbach, Gottfried Keller, Hermann Hettner, Bernhard Fries, Jacob Moleschott, Heinrich Bernhard Oppenheim, and others. Kapp was increasingly seen as an outsider in the university and in 1842 he objected to the introduction of half-yearly examinations. In 1843 there were formal complaints from other faculty members about him. He considered the objections to be primarily political in their foundation and he offered to resign and the resignation was finally accepted in 1844. Feuerbach wrote to him congratulating him on his release from the prison of the university and "...the Neckar valley is indeed magnificent, but the narrower the valley, the wider the court councilors and other university poodles make themselves."

Kapp then entered politics and was elected to the Baden Chamber of Deputies for Offenburg in 1845. Kapp was involved in the production of the "Offenburg manifesto" in 1847. Kapp sought the subordination of the church to the state which he saw as the only guarantor of civil order and progress. He noted the history of France since the fall of Napoleon and claimed that the police state was doomed to fail. After the March Revolution of 1848 he claimed that it had been caused by the state's blockade of reform. He took part in the assemblies on 12 September 1847 and 19 March 1848 led by the radical republican groups of Gustav von Struve and Friedrich Hecker as well as in meetings of constitutional-moderate liberals in Heppenheim in October 1847. After being elected into an assembly he tried to remain non-partisan but was forced to resign from the Frankfurt National Assembly. He considered the assembly to be made up of corpses.
