= Frankfurt Constitution =

Unadopted German constitution of 1849

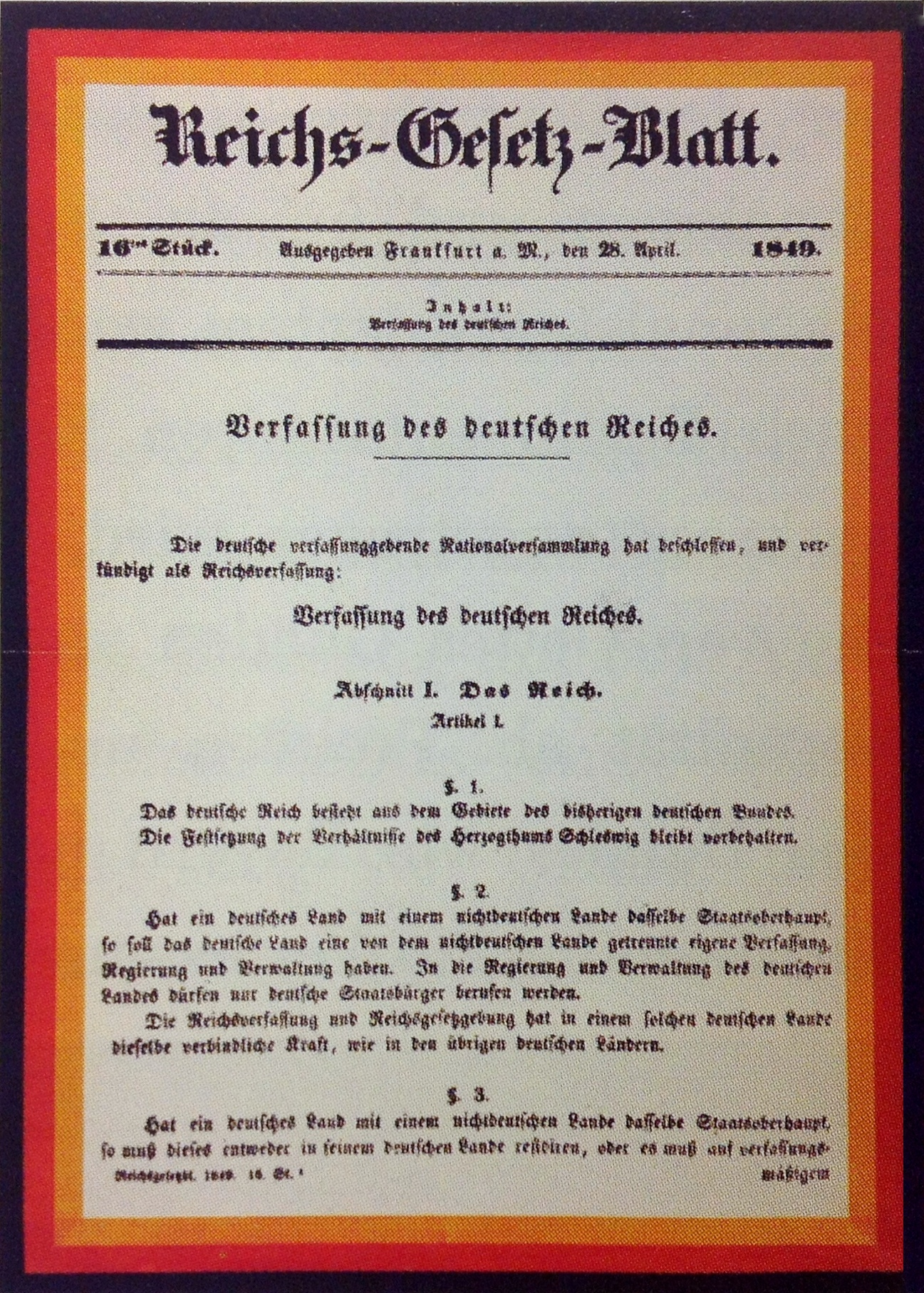
The official publication of the Frankfurt Constitution in the Reichs-Gesetz-Blatt of 28 April 1849

The Frankfurt Constitution (German: Frankfurter Reichsverfassung) or Constitution of St. Paul's Church (Paulskirchenverfassung), officially named the Constitution of the German Empire (Verfassung des Deutschen Reiches) of 28 March 1849, was an unsuccessful attempt to create a unified German nation from the states of the German Confederation.

The Frankfurt National Assembly drew up the constitution during the German revolutions of 1848–1849 for the emerging German Empire of 1848–1849, which was committed to popular sovereignty and had already created a Provisional Central Power (Provisorische Zentralgewalt) for Germany. The National Assembly adopted the constitution on 28 March 1849, and twenty-eight German states collectively recognized it on 14 April.

The constitution created a constitutional monarchy with a hereditary emperor who appointed ministers responsible to himself. The main legislative body, the Reichstag, had two chambers, the Volkshaus (House of the People), which was to be elected by universal male suffrage, and the Staatenhaus (House of States), half of whose members were to be appointed by the state governments and half by the state parliaments. The fundamental rights of the German people were enforceable before an imperial court.

The largest German states, notably Prussia, actively opposed both the constitution and the National Assembly, and many conservative governments found the Frankfurt Constitution too liberal. The power struggle between Prussia and Austria also played a role. The southern German kingdoms, in particular Bavaria and Württemberg, favoured a confederation of states that would include Austria. Because of the opposition, elections to the new Reichstag never took place, and the National Assembly was unable to enforce the Constitution. With the failure of the 1848 revolution, the Frankfurt Constitution was not implemented. It was nevertheless Germany's first democratic constitution and the first to encompass the entire nation. In the years and decades that followed, the Frankfurt Constitution inspired politicians and had an influence on both state and later national constitutions such as the Constitution of the German Empire. The constitution's extensive catalogue of fundamental rights was especially important.

== Background ==
The German Confederation, 1815–1848 and again 1851–1866

After Napoleon's defeat by the Sixth Coalition in May 1814, the Congress of Vienna reorganized Germany as the German Confederation in June 1815. It was a confederation of states that was to provide security both internally and externally. The purpose of the Confederation was thus quite limited: it was not intended, for example, to standardise legal relationships or create a common economic area. Federal law was based primarily on the Federal Act of 1815 and the Final Act of the Vienna Ministerial Conferences of 1820, which drew up a supplement to the Federal Act. Together they formed the federal constitution.

The most important federal body, the Federal Convention, was a congress of delegates from the individual states under Austrian leadership. There were no courts, no executive government, no parliament and therefore no separation of powers. The Confederation did not over time develop such functions since the largest members (above all Austria, Prussia and Bavaria) had no interest in federal reform. For them the Confederation served primarily to suppress national, liberal and democratic endeavours.

The anti-democratic political status quo, combined with a sharp economic downturn in the mid-1840s, a series of failed harvests and the overthrow of King Louis-Philippe of France in February 1848, sparked the German revolutions of 1848–1849, out of which came the Frankfurt Constitution.

== Origin ==
=== Early drafts ===
At the end of 1847, opponents of the German Confederation held a meeting in Offenburg on 12 September and a conference at Heppenheim on 10 October. Their core demands were presented in a motion by Friedrich Daniel Bassermann in the second chamber of the Baden Parliament on 12 February 1848. His call for a national representation of the German estates, which would sit as a second chamber alongside the Federal Convention (Bundestag), helped trigger the election of a pan-German parliament that would address political reform.

On 5 March, liberals and democrats met as the Heidelberg Assembly of 51 and elected a Committee of Seven who were to prepare for a preliminary parliament to meet in Frankfurt. They selected 573 men (the pre-parliament) to prepare for elections to a national assembly. It in turn set up a Committee of Fifty, which was to critically monitor the Bundestag until the elections. The committees and assemblies were private initiatives but were nevertheless of considerable public importance.

=== Pre-parliament ===
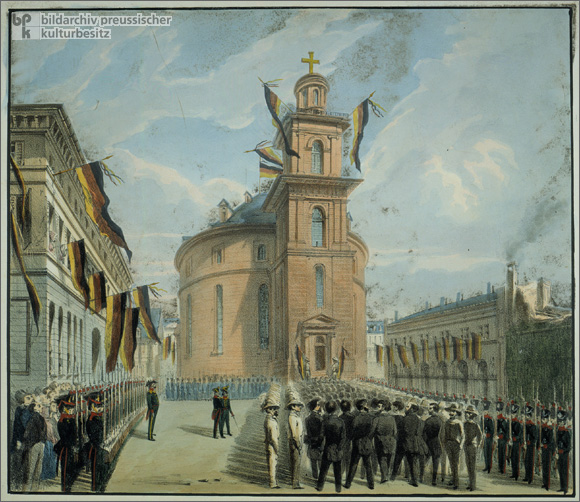
Lithograph of a procession of delegates to the pre-parliament moving toward St. Paul's Church on 30 March 1848 through a phalanx of students and other supporters

Between 31 March and 3 April, the pre-parliament met four times in plenary session in Frankfurt's St. Paul's Church. It made sure that the Bundestag incorporated Prussia's eastern provinces (the Province of Prussia and parts of Posen) into the German Confederation, and its calls for freedom helped the term "fundamental rights" achieve a certain universality. The pre-parliament was also important because politicians began to group themselves according to their political leanings.

The pre-parliament initiated two Bundestag resolutions on the election of a national assembly by the German people. The individual states were to elect representatives to a constituent national assembly which was to draft a constitution for the whole of Germany. It would then be agreed on by the individual states. The duly elected Frankfurt Parliament convened on 18 May 1848.

=== Constitutional deliberations ===
The parliament formed a 30-member constitutional committee on 24 May to draft a constitution. The committee decided to deal first with the basic rights of the German people. It was later accused of having delayed the adoption of the full constitution by its long discussion of basic rights and that the delay was one of the main reasons for the failure of the 1848 revolution. The representatives, however, considered fundamental rights to be crucially important in order to give Germany a standardised legal basis and to bind the individual states to it. The forward-looking catalogue of fundamental rights was passed as a federal law on 27 December 1848 and then incorporated into the constitution.

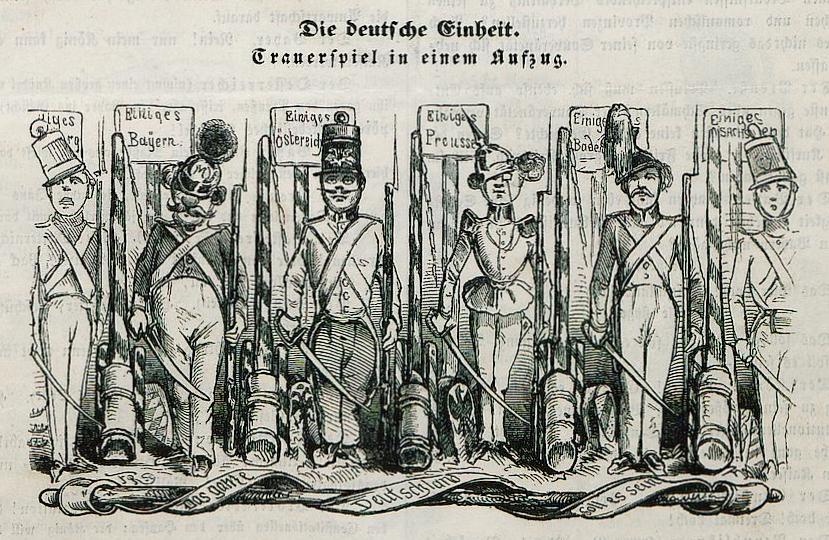
Cartoon from the Münchner Leuchtkugeln of 1848 showing each state viewing itself as separate (the signs next to each soldier read "United Bavaria, United Prussia, etc.). The caption at the top reads "German Unity. A Tragedy in one Act".

In October the National Assembly began discussions on the draft constitution. The question of whether a united Germany was to include any part of Austria, notably its German-speaking regions, proved to be a considerable obstacle. It was not until March 1849, after Austria had reaffirmed its independence and unity in its new March Constitution (1. § 2), that the Frankfurt Parliament agreed on the lesser German solution and excluded Austria.

The Volkshaus of the Reichstag was to be elected by equal manhood suffrage of "any person who is entitled to vote in the municipal elections of his place of residence and who pays any direct state tax". Germany was to have a hereditary emperor who could only postpone laws passed by the Reichstag (suspensive veto), not completely prevent them (absolute veto).

In the opinion of the National Assembly, it alone had the right to bring the constitution into force. The governments of the individual states were asked for their opinions in the final phase but not for a formal constitutional agreement. According to the Central Power Act, the Central Power was not to be involved either (§ 3). In a close vote (267 to 263), the National Assembly on 27 March 1849 approved the constitution. It was not Archduke John of Austria, the temporary head of state (Reichsverweser), but the president of the National Assembly and the deputies who signed the constitution.

== Contents ==
=== German Empire ===
The existing German Confederation was renamed the German Empire. Article I of the Constitution explicitly refers to the Confederation: "The German Empire consists of the territory of the former German Confederation."

In § 87, the constitution refers to the Empire as a "federal state" (Bundesstaat), as the Central Power Act had already done in § 2a. The door is left open for the German-Austrian states to join the Empire in § 87 of the constitution ("As long as the German-Austrian lands do not participate in the federal state..").

Section II, "The Imperial Authority", defines the basic competences of the Reich. As a rule, administration and justice were to remain a matter for the individual states, but the Empire reserved the right to extend its competences (competence-competence). Paragraph 66 states: "Imperial laws take precedence over the laws of the individual states, unless they are expressly attributed only a subsidiary application" and § 194 that "No provision in the constitution or laws of a single state may contradict the Imperial Constitution".

Foreign and military power were the exclusive competence of the Empire (§ 11–19). An individual state was therefore no longer allowed to have its own ambassadors abroad and had to accept guidelines for its military, although the individual states were still responsible for the deployment, training and provisioning of troops. Only the Empire had the right to wage war.

The imperial constitution provided for a large number of fields of activity for its legislation (§ 20–67). They can be summarised as legal, social, and economic infrastructure: the legal status of waterways and railways, customs, common taxes on production and consumption, trade, post and telegraphy, coinage, weights and measures, imperial and state citizenship laws and general measures for health care. The Empire was authorised to introduce imperial taxes "in extraordinary cases" (§ 51).

=== Political system ===
Chart illustrating the political system set forth in the Constitution of the German Empire, 1849. (In the election block on the lower left, "unblemished" means "of good standing".)

The constitution provided for a head of the Empire with an executive branch, a Reichstag (legislature) and an imperial court (judiciary). The powers were not simply to be separated from each other but were also to be able to control each other. Imperial laws could be proposed both by a house of the Reichstag and by the government (§ 80 and 99); the government (executive) could exercise a suspensive veto over Reich laws.

The head of the Empire had the title emperor (Kaiser) (§ 70). Once the imperial title had been transferred to a reigning prince, it was to be hereditary, falling to the first-born son (§ 69). The imperial ministers were appointed by the emperor; an act of the emperor became valid only when a minister of the Empire countersigned and thus assumed responsibility (§ 73, § 74).

The constitution says little more about the composition of the government or its exact responsibilities; in any case, a parliamentary form of government is not explicitly stipulated. The executive government did open up the possibility for it, however, for example by allowing ministers to be members of the Volkshaus, unlike under the constitutions in force from 1867 to 1918. The political development in 1848/49 went in the direction of parliamentarization, since a number of deputies proved to be suitable ministers and state undersecretaries. According to legal historian Ernst Rudolf Huber, there is much to suggest that the government would have been de facto parliamentarized after 1849.

The constitutional monarchies of the 19th century were characterised by a bicameral parliament. Only the Left Party had called for a unicameral parliament in the National Assembly. The Frankfurt Constitution stated (§ 96) that all members of the Reichstag should have a free mandate – that is, not be bound by orders or instructions from their constituency – enjoy immunity (§ 117) and receive allowances (§ 95) so that they would not be dependent on their own assets in order to be able to devote time to parliamentary activities. The Reichstag was to consist of two chambers (§ 85), and a member could belong to only one at a time.( § 97) A resolution of the Reichstag required the consent of both houses ( § 100).

The Volkshaus represented the German people as a whole and was elected according to equal manhood suffrage. The basis for the election was the Imperial Election Act of 12 April 1849. The legislative period was four years after the first Reichstag election and three years thereafter (§ 94).

The Staatenhaus (House of States) represented the individual states. The constitution allocated to each individual state a certain number of members according to a list (§ 87) which was based primarily on the number of inhabitants. Half of the members were appointed by the state government (executive) and the other half by the state parliament (§ 88). Members of the Staatenhaus were elected for six years, with half of the seats being renewed every three years (§ 92). A member of the Staatenhaus was not allowed to be an imperial minister (§ 123).

An imperial court exercised jurisdiction at the federal level and was therefore not a general supreme court above the state courts. It served as the first and only authority for constitutional and political issues. It ruled on disputes between states or states and the Empire, between the imperial government, the Staatenhaus and the Volkshaus as well as between state bodies. The court was also open to constitutional complaints; a German could sue for his fundamental rights and other rights before the court on the basis of the constitution.

Paragraphs 178 and 179 called for public trials, oral criminal proceedings and jury trials for the "more serious crimes and all political offenses". The introduction of the jury trial was followed by its adoption by the overwhelming majority of German states, continued in the German Empire and lasted until the Emminger Reform of 4 January 1924 during the Weimar Republic.

The Empire was responsible for internal security if a state was unable or unwilling to provide it within its own territory. The aim was to prevent the constitution from being broken or circumvented by subversion from above or below. The constitution could be amended only by a resolution of the Volkshaus with a two-thirds majority vote and the approval of the emperor. After eight days, the Volkshaus vote had to be repeated.

Imperial interventions and executions were modelled on the corresponding measures of the German Confederation. If there was unrest in a state, it could ask the Empire to intervene. If necessary, the Empire itself could take action. An imperial execution, on the other hand, was directed against a state government which violated the constitution or breached the peace of the Empire (§ 54 and § 55).

=== Taxation ===
The German Empire of 1871 to 1918 drew its revenue almost exclusively from state payments to it. The Frankfurt Constitution envisioned a more mixed system. The federal government was allowed various sources of income in addition to financial contributions from the states: customs and shipping duties, production and consumption taxes and numerous other sources (§ 34 to § 36). The federal government was allowed to distribute the revenue from customs duties, common indirect taxes and financial monopolies to the individual states at its own discretion; there was no provision for the other levies.

Per paragraph 187, part of the constitution's section on fundamental rights, the "people's representatives have a decisive vote" on taxation and the state budget.

=== Fundamental rights ===
The Frankfurt Constitution had a comprehensive catalogue of fundamental rights which extended for sixty paragraphs (§ 130 – § 189). Freedom of the press, the abolition of censorship, freedom of movement, freedom of association and assembly, freedom of religion and equal rights for all denominations were classic civil liberties. A citizen of the Empire was allowed to emigrate and enjoyed the consular protection of the German state abroad. In addition, the constitution intended to abolish the prerogatives of the nobility (§ 137), which would have had a significant impact on the social structure of Germany.

== Failure to be adopted ==
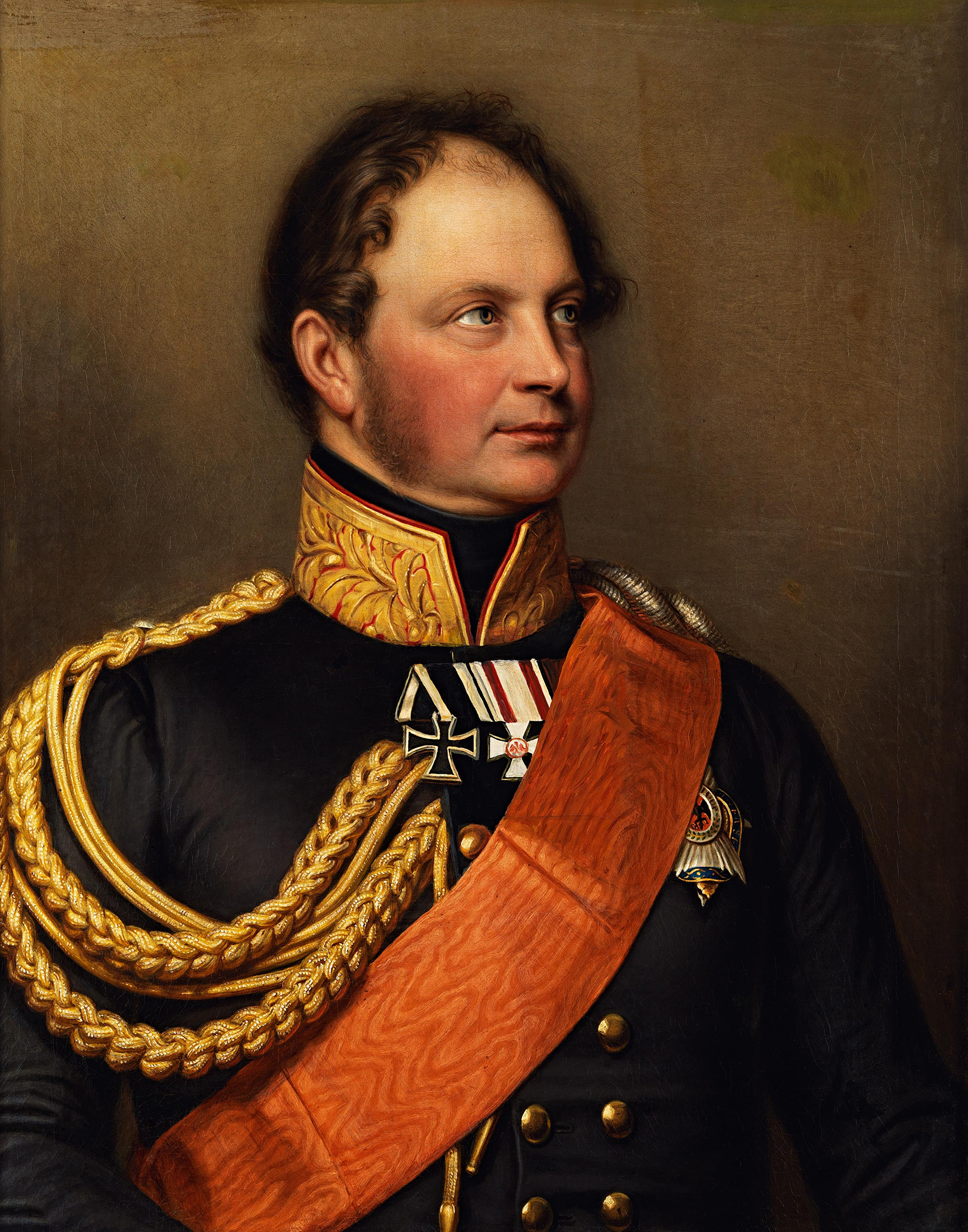
King Frederick William IV of Prussia. His rejection of both the Frankfurt Constitution and the proffered imperial crown doomed the work of the Frankfurt National Assembly.

The Frankfurt Constitution was proclaimed on 28 March 1849. There was broad popular support and many calls in favour of recognising it. Twenty-eight mostly smaller states collectively recognized the constitution on 14 April and accepted the choice of the Prussian king, Frederick William IV, as emperor, but the larger states in particular refused to accept it. Frederick William also rejected it, although his cabinet (conditionally) and the Prussian National Assembly spoke out in favour of its adoption. Frederick William also refused the offer of the imperial crown because he would not accept it from a popularly elected assembly, only another German prince. As a result, the planned parliamentary elections did not take place, and the National Assembly was unable to enforce the constitution due to the military superiority of the individual states that refused to recognize it.

=== Later impact ===
Two months after its enactment, the Frankfurt Constitution served as a model for the draft Erfurt Union Constitution. Prussia wanted to make its own attempt at unification in a more conservative form in cooperation with the "central" states, which excluded Austria, Bavaria, Württemberg, Saxony, Hanover and a few smaller states. Even though the union was ultimately not realised, the draft constitution preserved much of the Frankfurt model and thus helped to moderate the reactionary period that followed the 1848 Revolution.

When the North German Constitution of 1867 was drafted, the Frankfurt Constitution was heavily referenced. The constituent Reichstag amended Bismarck's draft constitution in its direction. Later during the German Empire, it was a basis for discussion in the development of the new imperial constitution. When the Weimar Constitution was drafted in 1919, the Frankfurt catalogue of fundamental rights was an important model. Even in the Parliamentary Council (1948–1949), the framers of the Basic Law for West Germany and today's Federal Republic of Germany quoted from the Frankfurt Constitution.

== Assessment ==
Historians and scholars of constitutional law largely agree that the Frankfurt Constitution was a great achievement and would have made Germany one of the most progressive constitutional states of its time. According to Jörg-Detlef Kühne, it was the only German constitution "for whose implementation broad sections of the population actively fought."

According to Günter Wollstein, the theoretical structure of the Frankfurt Constitution was a coherent and practicable draft, as well as being balanced and progressive. It retained its appeal even during the modernisation efforts of Imperial Germany. Ernst Rudolf Huber wrote: "The Frankfurt attempt to combine the great principles of freedom, equality, unity and central leadership in constitutional law retained its defining power in German political thought and action for a full century."

Anna Caroline Limbach emphasised in particular the great consistency with which liberal goals were enshrined in criminal law. The recognition of inviolable human rights and humanist thinking in the National Assembly was evident in the abolition of the death penalty, which was only realised in the Basic Law a hundred years later. The separation of powers and independence of the administration of justice demonstrated the same consistency. Liberal criminal law was not to be restricted even in times of emergency.
