= Friedrich Daniel Bassermann =

German politician (1811–1855)

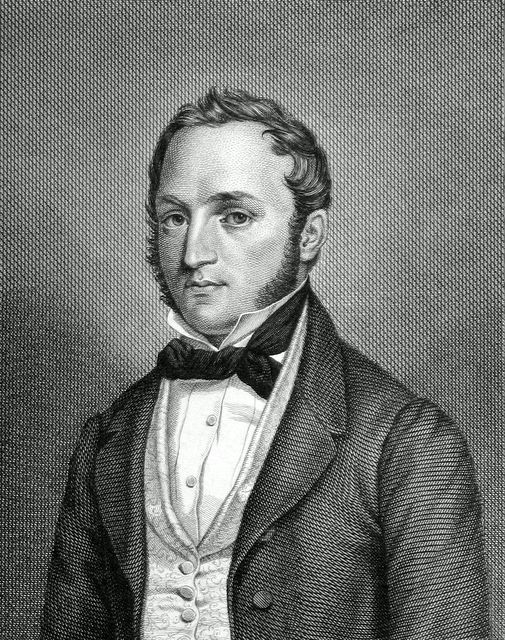
Friedrich Daniel Bassermann

Friedrich Daniel Bassermann (24 February 1811 in Mannheim – 29 July 1855) was a German liberal politician who is best known for calling for a pan-German Parliament at the Frankfurt Parliament. He emphasized the value of a national self-esteem based on progress and freedom.

He was one of the most popular representatives in the Second Chamber of the Assembly of the Estates of Baden and played an important role in the creation of the first freely elected parliament for a German nation-state, the Frankfurt Parliament. As chairman of the constitution committee and under-secretary of state in the Interior Ministry of the Provisional Central Power, he contributed greatly to the Paulskirchenverfassung of the Parliament. As a publisher he founded the Deutsche Zeitung, one of the most influential newspapers in the period leading up to the Revolution of 1848/49.

== Family ==
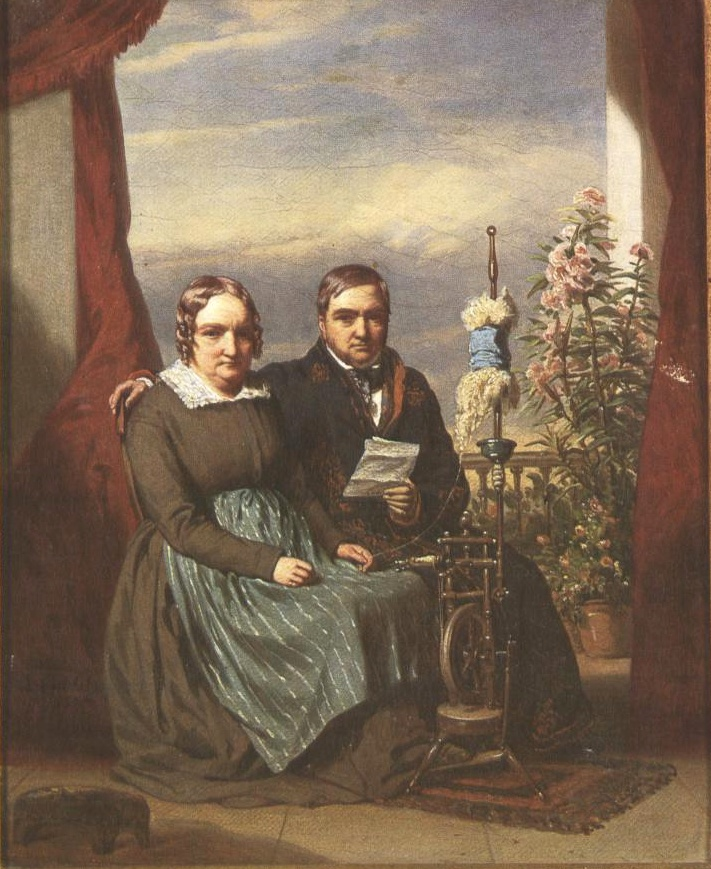
Portrait of Basserman's parents in 1845

Bassermann came from a well-known merchant family from Baden and the Palatinate. His great-grandfather Johann Christoph Bassermann married the propertied widow Katharina Parvinci in 1736 and acquired from his mother-in-law the inn "Zu den drei Königen" in Heidelberg, which was to be the foundation of the rise of the Bassermann family. His father Friedrich Ludwig Bassermann, after marrying Wilhelmine Reinhardt, daughter of the Lord Mayor of Mannheim and clothier Johann Wilhelm Reinhardt, was one of the most prominent businessmen of Mannheim as a merchant and banker and was most active in the wine, tobacco, grain, and textile trades. The family home was on the Mannheim market place. Friedrich Daniel, who had been named after his grandfather, was the second oldest child out of the six children who survived to adulthood, and the oldest son.

Friedrich Daniel Bassermann was married to Emilie Karbach (1811–1872), the daughter of a priest, and they had 5 children, one of whom was Emil Bassermann-Jordan, owner of the vineyard Weingut Geheimer Rat Dr. von Bassermann-Jordan in Deidesheim.

== Education and career ==
After attending the Karl-Friedrich-Gymnasium, in 1826 Bassermann started as an apprentice at the Mannheim iron trading company under his uncle Johann Ludwig Bassermann and continued his business training at trading companies with which the family had good relations, in Paris and Le Havre. Starting in 1829, at the University of Heidelberg he attended lectures in physics, chemistry and botany, followed by a practical apothecary's training in Nuremberg. During his time in Heidelberg, he became a fraternity member in Erlangen and probably also in Heidelberg in 1829/30 with the Alte Heidelberger Fraternity. After recovering in Nuremberg from a case of typhus, he finished his education through time spent at the firms Julius Stettner in Trieste and Faber & Cie. in London. In late 1833 he established himself independently, when, with financial support from his father, he acquired the Drogengeschäft, wholesaler of groceries and pharmaceuticals, from the Giulini brothers in Mannheim. When Baden the German Customs Union (Zollverein), he was able to significantly expand his business in a short space of time and thus became a respected merchant in his home city, and a well-known participant in public life.

This is also reflected in his commitment to the cultural life of Mannheim. He was appointed to the Theaterkommittee of the National Theatre Mannheim and was a member of the Mannheim art society, and the music society. In 1835 he was among the founding members of the Casino, a reading society.

== Political career ==
=== Second Chamber of Baden ===
In 1838 Bassermann for the first time became active in local politics when he was elected to the Small Committee of Citizens, which he chaired after 1839. Like David Hansemann in Aachen, Gottfried Ludolf Camphausen in Cologne or August von der Heydt in Elberfeld he was one of those liberal politicians who had their political origins in the communes. In the larger cities, with the exception of a few Hanseatic cities, they had largely displaced the traditional notables.

Already in the following year, he belonged to the Hallgartenkreis around Johann Adam von Itzstein. In 1841 Bassermann became a member of the Second Chamber of the Assembly of Estates in Baden, as representative for Mannheim. There, due to his speeches, he soon was counted among the most distinguished opposition politicians and counted among his friends various other well-known deputies, such as for example the popular Mannheim lawyer Friedrich Hecker (elected in 1842 to the Second Chamber), with whom he was to come to fundamental political disagreements with later, however. The witticism uttered by Bassermann in a speech in the Second Chamber, "The people is not there for the government, the government is there for the people", became famous in the German Confederation. In the Second Chamber, Bassermann became influential not only through his fight for civil liberties, but as an authority on the customs, budgetary and transport policy of Baden, in the last case pressing particularly for the construction of railway lines in the Grand Duchy. Bassermann also worked on the first and second editions of the Rotteck-Welckersches Staatslexikon of Karl von Rotteck and Carl Theodor Welcker, a political encyclopedia of the time.

Already in 1841, he sold his firm to his younger brother Julius Bassermann, as his political career left him no time for his business, and became a professional politician. In 1843, the Urlaubsstreit ("Leave Crisis") took place: the government of Baden sought to deny granting leave to civil servants who had been elected to the Second Chamber for the opposition, in order to prevent them from taking up their mandate. In this context, Bassermann organised the rejection of the government budget, and used the first parliamentary motion of no confidence in German history to force the resignation of the conservative government under Friedrich Landolin Karl von Blittersdorf. The more flexible position of Blittersdorf's successors, Christian Friedrich von Boeckh, Karl Friedrich Nebenius and especially Johann Baptist Bekk enabled the Grand-Duchy of Baden's return to the progressive politics of Ludwig Georg von Winter, and Bassermann's further growth as an opposition politician.

=== German unity as a political project ===
In the same year Bassermann, founded a publishing house in Heidelberg together with Karl Mathy, that would later become known as Bassermann'sche Verlagsbuchhandlung. Its most well-known publication was the Deutsche Zeitung, which was led since 1 July 1847 by Georg Gottfried Gervinus, Ludwig Häusser, Gustav Höfken, Karl Mathy and Carl Joseph Anton Mittermaier, and was oriented towards liberal politics and argued for a German nation-state.

The significance of the Deutsche Zeitung lay not only in its strong political influence, but also above all in its role as a central network for liberals from different German states, who worked for the newspaper as correspondents, reporters, members of the board and in other functions. Thus, the liberal movement had an organ for the formation of shared political positions. The newspaper was seen as an intellectual one, and as a leading publication due to its high standards of quality, but it also constantly ran at a financial loss due to deliberately gearing its business towards the entire German Confederation. As its co-founder, publisher and most important financial backer, Bassermann definitively became the mouthpiece of the liberal movement in the states of the German Confederation, and a champion of the German unification movement.

On 15 April 1844, in connection with a motion by Welcker from 1831, Bassermann gave a speech in the Second Chamber, in which he demanded for the first time that an all-German parliament should be set up, to create a German nation-state. This demand was rejected as by the Baden government under Alexander von Dusch as being outside its scope, but it corresponded to sentiments widely held in practically all the states of the German Confederation. Subsequently, Bassermann was much in demand as a speaker at political gatherings, and was feted as one of the most popular politicians of southern Germany.

Bassermann's political programme, which, apart from the question of German unity, concerned itself especially with matters of economic, trade and fiscal policy, was also echoed at the Heppenheim conference on 10 October 1847, which Bassermann as well as Mathy, Itzstein and Hansemann played an important role in organising.

The results of the conference, which Mathy published in the Deutsche Zeitung, advocated the support and expansion of the customs union as a means of achieving political unity of Germany (which Bassermann supported only after initial reluctance), and more generally, an economic programme that emphasised personal freedoms and clearly supported the processes of change associated with the Industrial Revolution.

In the revolutionary mood shortly before the start of the French Revolution of 1848, Bassermann made a speech to the Second Chamber of Baden on 12 February 1848, justifying the motion that he had made a week beforehand, asking for an indirect representation of the people at the level of the German Confederation, as this would secure political freedoms and strengthen the feelings of German unity. In relation to the German Confederation, the German nation was feeling an overwhelming aversion towards its highest authority, and a good relationship could only be restored through a constitution. Thus, Bassermann partly triggered the March Revolution in Germany. The movement that resulted from this demand led to the Heidelberg meeting of 5 March 1848, which in turn led to the Vorparlament of 31 March – 5 April in the Frankfurt Paulskirche. Bassermann participated in both events, where, together with other moderate liberals, he could work towards ensuring that the majority of those present regarded the creation of a constitution in consultation with the German Confederation and in the context of a national constitutional assembly as the highest priority, and not the formation of a revolutionary government as demanded by Hecker und Struve. Bassermann was then nominated by the Baden government as vice-chairman of the "committee of seventeen", which prepared the way to a new German constitution.
