= Karl Mathy =

German statesman (1807–1868)

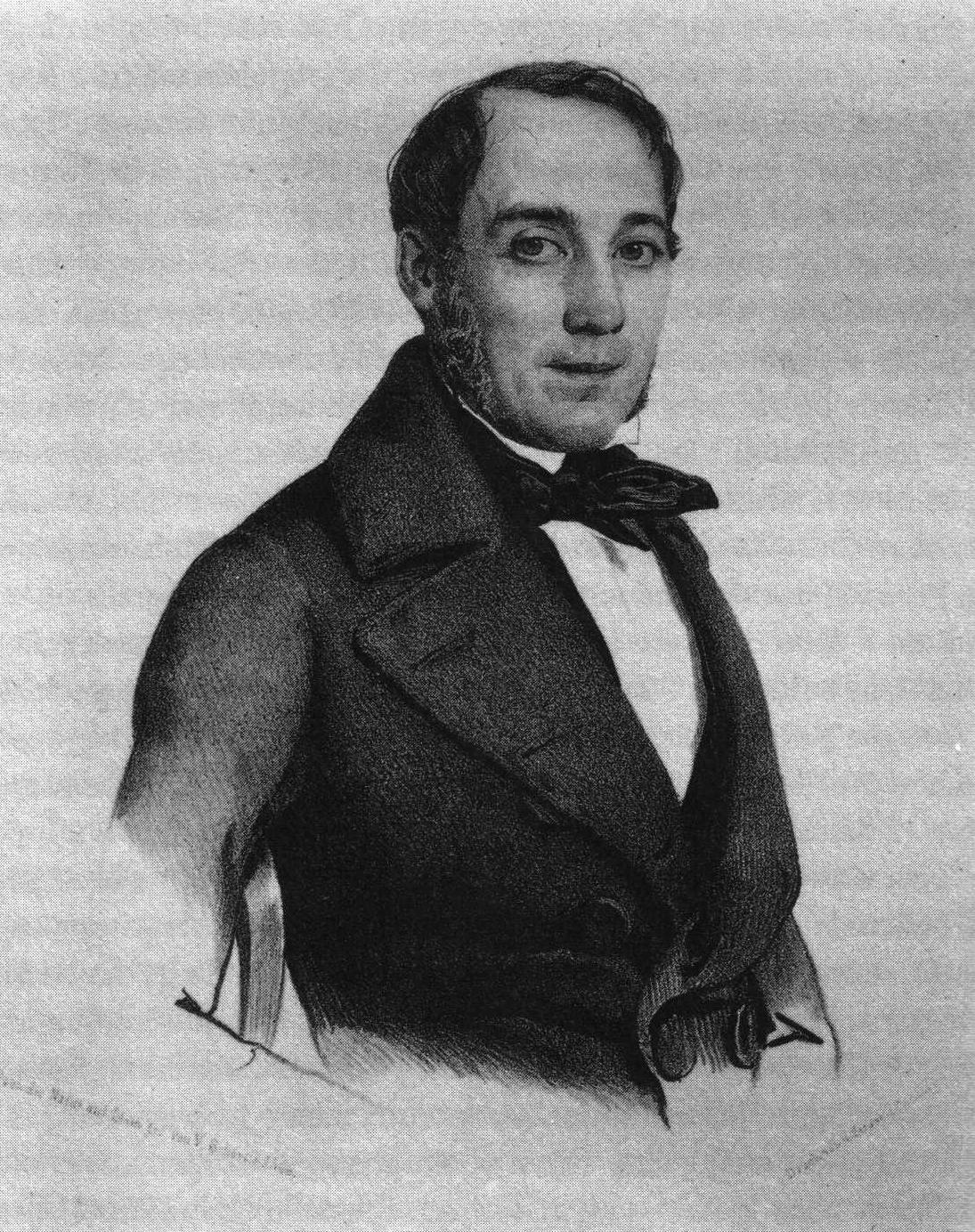
Mathy in an 1842 lithography

Karl Friedrich Wilhelm Mathy (March 17, 1807 – February 3, 1868), was a statesman from the Grand Duchy of Baden.

He was born at Mannheim. He studied law and politics at Heidelberg, and entered the Baden government department of finance in 1829. His sympathy with the revolutionary ideas of 1830, expressed in his paper the Zeitgeist, cost him his appointment in 1834, and he made his way to Switzerland, where he contributed to the Jeune Suisse directed by Mazzini.

On his return to Baden in 1840 he edited the Landtagszeitung at Karlsruhe, and in 1842 he entered the estates for the town of Konstanz. In 1843 Mathy founded a publishing house in Heidelberg together with Friedrich Daniel Bassermann, that would later become known as Bassermann'sche Verlagsbuchhandlung. He became one of the opposition leaders and in 1847 helped to found the Deutsche Zeitung, a paper which eventually did much to further the cause of German unity.

He took part in the preliminary parliament and in the Frankfurt Parliament, where he supported the policy of Heinrich von Gagern, and after the refusal of Frederick William IV to accept the imperial crown he still worked for the cause of unity. He was made finance minister in Baden in May 1849, but was dismissed after a few days of office. He then applied his financial knowledge to banking business in Cologne, Berlin, Gotha and Leipzig. He was recalled to Baden in 1862, and in 1864 became president of the new ministry of commerce. He sought to bring Baden institutions into line with those of northern Germany with a view to ultimate union, and when in 1866 Baden took sides with Austria against Prussia he sent in his resignation. After the war he became president of a new cabinet, but he did not live to see the realization of the policy for which he had striven. He died at Karlsruhe.

His letters during the years 1846-1848 were edited by Ludwig Mathy (Leipzig, 1899), and his life was written by Gustav Freytag (Leipzig, 1869).
